= Orbital rhabdomyosarcoma =

Malignant pediatric orbital tumor

- Specialty: Oncology
- Treatment: Chemotherapy; Radiotherapy; Surgery

Orbital rhabdomyosarcoma is a subtype of rhabdomyosarcoma (RMS), a malignant soft-tissue tumor arising from primitive mesenchymal cells with skeletal muscle differentiation, that develops within the orbit, the bony cavity containing the eye and its surrounding structures. It is the most common malignant tumor of the orbit in children, representing roughly 9% of all RMS cases.

== Epidemiology ==
Orbital RMS is predominantly a disease of childhood, with most cases diagnosed before the age of ten, though presentations in adolescents are recognized. Estimates place the annual incidence at around four to five new cases per million children under 20. Institutional case series have generally reported more favorable survival for orbital RMS than for RMS arising at other primary sites. A population-based analysis of United States cancer registry data found rhabdomyosarcoma to be the most common malignancy affecting the orbital adnexa in children, with an overall five-year observed survival rate of approximately 90% across RMS subtypes in that cohort.

== Clinical presentation ==
The hallmark presenting sign is rapidly progressive, painless proptosis (bulging of the eye), often accompanied by periorbital swelling and globe displacement. Because these signs overlap with more common, benign causes of childhood orbital swelling, diagnosis can be delayed; case reports have documented orbital RMS being initially mistaken for infectious or inflammatory orbital disease.

== Diagnosis and histopathology ==
Diagnosis relies on orbital imaging (CT or MRI) to characterize the mass and assess local extension, followed by biopsy for histopathological and immunohistochemical confirmation. Orbital RMS is most commonly of the embryonal histological subtype, which, unlike the alveolar subtype more typical of RMS at other sites, is associated with a comparatively favorable prognosis. Immunohistochemical staining for markers such as desmin, myogenin, and MyoD1 is used to confirm skeletal muscle differentiation and distinguish RMS from other small round blue cell tumors of childhood. Cytogenetic analysis for PAX3/PAX7–FOXO1 gene fusions, characteristic of the alveolar subtype, is increasingly used to refine diagnosis and risk stratification.

== Molecular and genetic features ==
As with rhabdomyosarcoma at other sites, orbital RMS tumors are characterized in part by their fusion-gene status. Alveolar-type tumors, though less common in the orbit than the embryonal subtype, are frequently associated with PAX3–FOXO1 or, less commonly, PAX7–FOXO1 gene fusions arising from characteristic chromosomal translocations. The presence of a fusion-positive genotype is associated with a more aggressive clinical course and informs modern risk-adapted treatment protocols, independent of the classical histological subtype. Embryonal-type orbital tumors, which lack these fusion transcripts, are correspondingly considered fusion-negative. Ongoing molecular research into RMS more broadly has explored additional oncogenic drivers, including RAS-pathway mutations and epigenetic regulators, though site-specific data for the orbit remains limited relative to other primary locations.

== Differential diagnosis ==
Because orbital RMS can present with signs common to several other pediatric orbital and periocular conditions, a range of alternative diagnoses is typically considered before biopsy confirmation. These include orbital cellulitis, inflammatory orbital pseudotumor, lymphangioma, neuroblastoma metastasis, Langerhans cell histiocytosis, and other small round blue cell tumors of childhood such as Ewing sarcoma and lymphoma. Prompt tissue sampling is generally advised when an orbital mass shows an inadequate response to standard treatment for a presumed infectious or inflammatory process, given the risk of diagnostic delay described in the clinical presentation literature above.

Orbital primary site is classified as a "favorable" site under the risk-stratification systems used by cooperative groups such as the Intergroup Rhabdomyosarcoma Study Group and Children's Oncology Group, reflecting its generally better prognosis relative to parameningeal, extremity, or other unfavorable primary sites.

== Treatment ==
Management is multidisciplinary, typically combining chemotherapy with local control via radiation therapy and/or surgery. Multi-agent chemotherapy regimens developed through cooperative group trials, most commonly variations of vincristine, actinomycin D, and cyclophosphamide (VAC), or vincristine, actinomycin D, and ifosfamide (IVA), form the backbone of systemic treatment, as with rhabdomyosarcoma at other sites. Because complete surgical resection of orbital tumors risks significant functional and cosmetic morbidity to the eye and surrounding structures, orbit-sparing approaches using chemotherapy and radiotherapy are generally favored over radical resection where feasible, with surgery typically reserved for initial biopsy and, where necessary, later debulking or management of residual disease. Radiation therapy is used when a complete response to chemotherapy is not achieved, with dosing and technique informed by the need to limit long-term effects on visual and orbital development in young patients.

== Prognosis ==
Orbital RMS carries one of the more favorable prognoses among RMS primary sites, with reported long-term survival rates generally exceeding 90% in modern series. Outcomes are influenced by tumor stage at diagnosis, extent of local invasion, and response to initial therapy.

== See also ==
- Rhabdomyosarcoma
- Embryonal rhabdomyosarcoma
- Orbital tumor
- Proptosis
