= Desmoplastic small-round-cell tumor =

Aggressive and rare cancer

- Other names: DSRCT
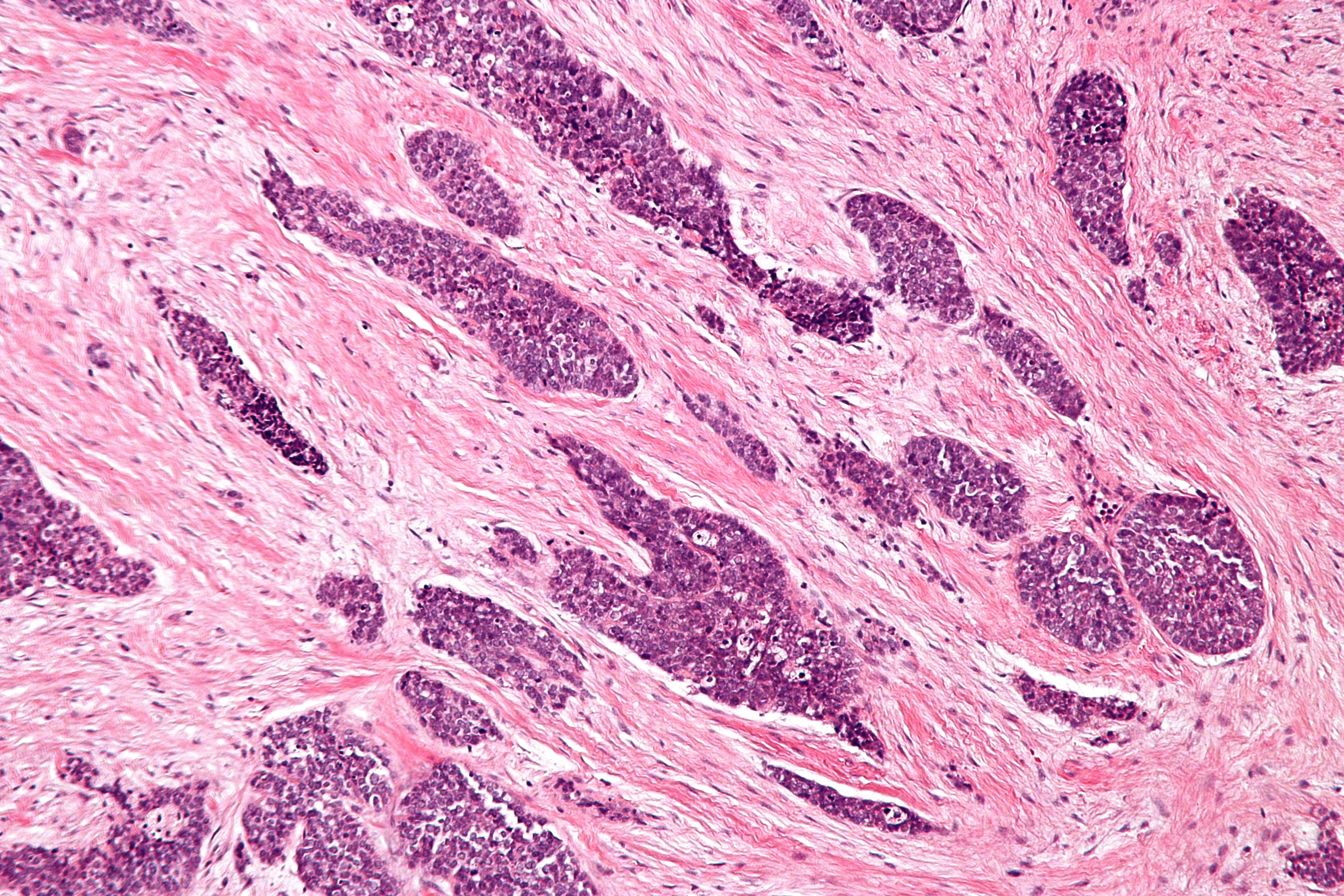
- Micrograph of a desmoplastic small round cell tumor, showing the characteristic desmoplastic stroma and angulated nests of small round cells. H&E stain.
- Specialty: Oncology
- Prognosis: Five-year survival rate 15%
- Frequency: ~200 cases reported

Desmoplastic small-round-cell tumor (DSRCT) is an aggressive and rare cancer that primarily occurs as masses in the abdomen. Other areas affected may include the lymph nodes, the lining of the abdomen, diaphragm, spleen, liver, parotid gland, chest wall, skull, spinal cord, large intestine, small intestine, bladder, kidney, brain, pancreas, lungs, testicles, ovaries, and the pelvis. Reported sites of metastatic spread include the liver, lungs, lymph nodes, brain, skull, and bones. It is characterized by the EWS-WT1 fusion protein.

The tumor is classified as a soft tissue sarcoma and a small round blue cell tumor. It most often occurs in male children. The disease rarely occurs in females, but when it does the tumors can be mistaken for ovarian cancer.

== Signs and symptoms ==
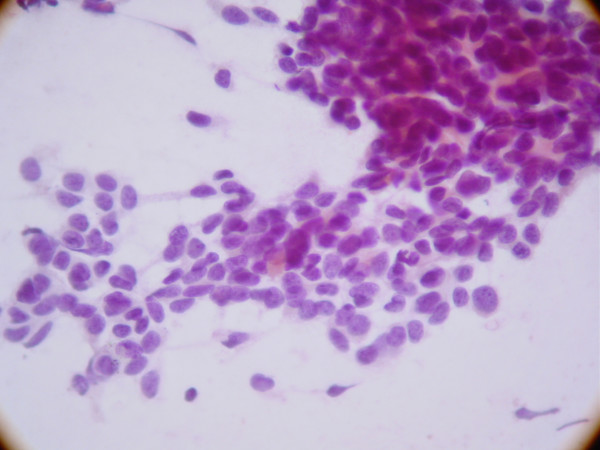
Display of small round blue cells characteristic of desmoplastic small-round-cell tumor.

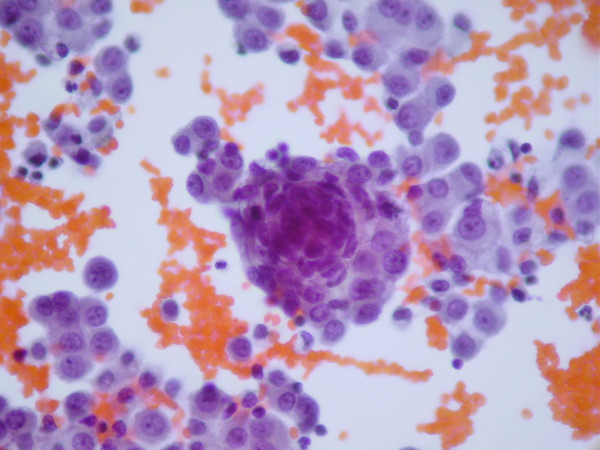
Cell exhibiting blue oval and round shapes of desmoplastic small-round blue cell tumor

There are few early warning signs that a patient has a DSRCT. Patients are often young and healthy as the tumors grow and spread uninhibited within the abdominal cavity. These are rare tumors and symptoms are often misdiagnosed by physicians. The abdominal masses can grow to enormous size before being noticed by the patient. The tumors can be felt as hard, round masses by palpating the abdomen.

First symptoms of the disease often include abdominal distention, abdominal mass, abdominal or back pain, gastrointestinal obstruction, lack of appetite, ascites, anemia, and cachexia.

Other reported symptoms include unknown lumps, thyroid conditions, hormonal conditions, blood clotting, kidney and urological problems, testicle, breast, uterine, vaginal, and ovarian masses.

== Genetics ==
There are no known risk factors that have been identified specific to the disease (but see below). The tumor appears to arise from the primitive cells of childhood, and is considered a childhood cancer.

Research has indicated that there is a chimeric relationship between DSRCT and Wilms' tumor and Ewing sarcoma. Together with neuroblastoma and non-Hodgkin's lymphoma, they form the small-cell tumors.

DSRCT is associated with a unique chromosomal translocation (notated as t(11;22)(p13:q12)) that merges the EWSR1 FET family gene normally located on band 12 of the long (or "q") arm of chromosome 22 with part of the WT1 transcription factor gene normally located on band 13 of the short arm of chromosome 11. The resulting EWSR1-WT1 fusion gene is converted to a fusion transcript that directs the formation of an EWSR1-WT1 chimeric protein. The EWSR1-WT1 chimeric protein contains the N-terminal transactivation domain of EWSR1 and the DNA-binding domain of WT1. This translocation is seen in virtually all cases of DSRCT.

The EWS/WT1 translocation product targets ENT4. ENT4 is also known as PMAT.

== Pathology ==
The entity was first described by pathologists William L. Gerald and Juan Rosai in 1989. Pathology reveals well circumscribed solid tumor nodules within a dense desmoplastic stroma. Often areas of central necrosis are present. Tumor cells have hyperchromatic nuclei with increased nuclear/cytoplasmic ratio.

On immunohistochemistry, these cells have trilinear coexpression including the epithelial marker cytokeratin, the mesenchymal markers desmin and vimentin, and the neuronal marker neuron-specific enolase. Thus, although initially thought to be of mesothelial origin due to sites of presentation, it is now hypothesized to arise from a progenitor cell with multiphenotypic differentiation.

== Diagnosis ==
=== Differential diagnosis ===
Because this is a rare tumor, not many family physicians or even oncologists are familiar with this disease. DSRCT in young patients can be mistaken for other abdominal tumors including rhabdomyosarcoma, neuroblastoma, and mesenteric carcinoid. In older patients DSRCT can resemble lymphoma, peritoneal mesothelioma, and peritoneal carcinomatosis. In males DSRCT may be mistaken for germ cell or testicular cancer while in females DSRCT can be mistaken for ovarian cancer. DSRCT shares characteristics with other small-round blue cell cancers including Ewing's sarcoma, acute leukemia, small cell mesothelioma, neuroblastoma, primitive neuroectodermal tumor, rhabdomyosarcoma, and Wilms' tumor.

== Treatment ==
DSRCT is frequently misdiagnosed. Adult patients should always be referred to a sarcoma specialist. This is an aggressive, rare, fast spreading tumor and both pediatric and adult patients should be treated at a sarcoma center.

There is no standard protocol for the disease. However, recent research has reported that some patients respond to high-dose (P6 Protocol) chemotherapy, maintenance chemotherapy, debulking operation, cytoreductive surgery, and radiation therapy. Other treatment options include: hematopoietic stem cell transplantation, intensity-modulated radiation therapy, radiofrequency ablation, stereotactic body radiation therapy, intraperitoneal hyperthermic chemoperfusion, and clinical trials.

== Prognosis ==
The prognosis for DSRCT remains poor. Prognosis depends upon the stage of the cancer. Because the disease can be misdiagnosed or remain undetected, tumors frequently grow large within the abdomen and metastasize or seed to other parts of the body.

There is no known organ or area of origin. DSRCT can metastasize through lymph nodes or the blood stream. Sites of metastasis include the spleen, diaphragm, liver, large and small intestine, lungs, central nervous system, bones, uterus, bladder, genitals, abdominal cavity, and the brain.

A multi-modality approach of high-dose chemotherapy, aggressive surgical resection, radiation, and stem cell rescue improves survival for some patients. Reports have indicated that patients will initially respond to first line chemotherapy and treatment but that relapse is common.

Some patients in remission or with inoperable tumor seem to benefit from long term low dose chemotherapy, turning DSRCT into a chronic disease.

== Research ==
The Stehlin Foundation currently offers DSRCT patients the opportunity to send samples of their tumors free of charge for testing. Research scientists are growing the samples on nude mice and testing various chemical agents to find which are most effective against the individual's tumor.

Patients with advanced DSRCT may qualify to participate in clinical trials that are researching new drugs to treat the disease.

The Cory Monzingo Foundation is a 501(c)(3) organization that supports the research for treatments and a cure for DSRCT. The Cory Monzingo Foundation provides funding to MD Anderson Cancer Center and may also provide funding to other nonprofit cancer research organizations.

In 2002, Nishio and al, established a novel human tumor cell line derived from the pleural effusion of a patient with a typical intra-abdominal DSRCT, called JN-DSRCT-1 that can now be used in research.

St. Jude Children's Research Hospital has, in 2018, make available resources from the Childhood Solid Tumor Network, that upon request gives access to patient-derived orthotopic xenografts.

== Alternative names ==
This disease is also known as: desmoplastic small round blue cell tumor; intra-abdominal desmoplastic small round blue cell tumor; desmoplastic small cell tumor; desmoplastic cancer; desmoplastic sarcoma; DSRCT.

There is no connection to peritoneal mesothelioma which is another disease sometimes described as desmoplastic.

== See also ==
- Desmoplasia
- Kate Granger (1981–2016), an English physician, whose diagnosis with DSRCT led to her campaigning for better patient care, and fund-raising for cancer research.
