= RMST (gene) =

Identifiers
- Aliases: RMST, LINC00054, NCRMS, NCRNA00054, rhabdomyosarcoma 2 associated transcript (non-protein coding), rhabdomyosarcoma 2 associated transcript
- External IDs: OMIM: 607045; GeneCards: RMST

Gene location (Human)
Chr.	Chromosome 12 (human)
Band	12q23.1|12q21	Start	97,430,884 bp
Band	12q23.1|12q21	End	97,598,415 bp
RNA expression pattern
Bgee	Human / Mouse (ortholog); Top expressed in: right lobe of thyroid gland; left lobe of thyroid gland; anterior pituitary; right uterine tube; corpus callosum; hypothalamus; prostate; left uterine tube; testicle; anterior cingulate cortex / n/a; More reference expression data
BioGPS	n/a
Orthologs
Databases	NCBI: entry; OMA: entry
Species	Human	Mouse
Entrez	196475	n/a
Ensembl	ENSG00000255794	n/a
UniProt	n a	n/a
RefSeq (mRNA)	n/a	n/a
RefSeq (protein)	n/a	n/a
Location (UCSC)	Chr 12: 97.43 – 97.6 Mb	n/a
PubMed search		n/a
- Wikidata
View/Edit Human

Rhabdomyosarcoma 2 associated transcript (RMST) is a long non-coding RNA. In humans, it is located on chromosome 12q21. It is expressed at higher levels in alveolar rhabdomyosarcoma than in embryonal rhabdomyosarcoma. In the brain, RMST is expressed in the developing ventral midbrain where dopaminergic neurons are formed, the developing isthmus and in the dorsal midline cells of the rostral neural tube. In the midbrain-hindbrain boundary region, its expression is regulated by PAX2.

== See also ==
- Long noncoding RNA
