= SRCT =

SRCT may refer to

- Small blue round cell tumour, a cancerous cell.
- Scottish Redundant Churches Trust, a church preservation society.
