= RMST =

RMST may refer to:

- Rectilinear minimum spanning tree, an algorithm in graph theory
- RMS Titanic Inc, a former U.S. company
- RMST (gene), a long non-coding RNA gene
