= Soft tissue sarcoma in cats and dogs =

Group of malignant tumors in cats and dogs

Soft tissue sarcoma refers to a broad group of tumors that originate from connective tissues. They tend to have similar histologic appearance and biological behavior, and can be either benign or malignant. Soft tissue sarcomas can arise in any part of the pet's body but skin and subcutaneous tumors are the most commonly observed. Soft-tissue sarcomas comprise approximately 15% of all skin and subcutaneous tumors in dogs and approximately 7% of all skin and subcutaneous tumors in cats. The variety of different tumors that fall under the category of soft tissue sarcomas includes fibrosarcoma, hemangiopericytoma, liposarcoma, rhabdomyosarcoma, leiomyosarcoma, malignant fibrous histiocytoma, malignant nerve sheath tumors, myxosarcoma, myxofibrosarcoma, mesenchymoma, and spindle cell tumor.

== Signs and symptoms ==
Soft tissue sarcomas are often detected as a firm mass located on the trunk, limbs, or oral cavity. The symptoms depend on the tumor's location and degree of invasion. For example, tumors in the gastrointestinal tract may cause vomiting, diarrhea, or weight loss. Tumors in the mouth may cause bad breath, difficulty swallowing, or lack of appetite. Tumors arising in the peripheral nerves may cause pain, lameness, or neurological symptoms.

== Diagnosis ==
Prior to initiating any type of treatment, it is important to gather as much information as possible regarding the tumor's tissue origin, size, site, histologic grade (level of aggressiveness) and whether it has spread to other organs. To definitively confirm the diagnosis of a soft-tissue sarcoma, the veterinarian will have to perform biopsy for histopathologic evaluation. Additional tests are performed in order to evaluate how advanced the cancer is. These tests generally involve blood and serum biochemical tests, chest X-rays to check for metastasis to the lungs and imaging studies [e.g. ultrasound, computed tomography (CT) or magnetic resonance imaging (MRI)] to evaluate the extent of the disease.

== Treatment ==
There are three main treatment options available to treat soft tissue sarcoma in cats and dogs: surgery, radiation therapy, and chemotherapy. Surgery alone or in combination with radiation therapy are used to treat the tumor at its original location, and chemotherapy is usually used to prevent or at least slow down the process of metastasis in pets diagnosed with tumor subtypes known to be highly aggressive.
