= Bella Rodriguez-Torres =

Girl who died of cancer (2002–2013)

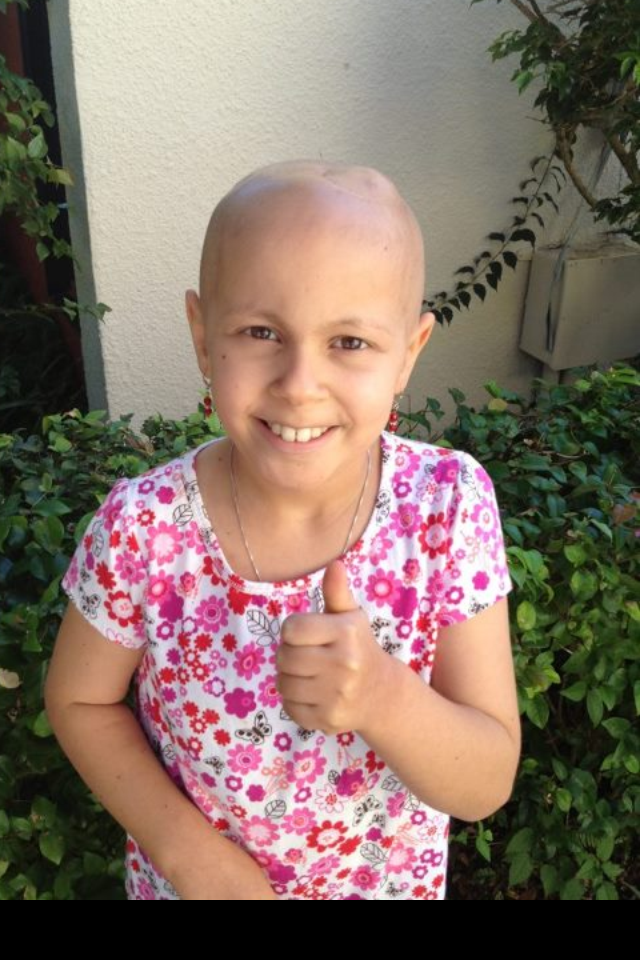
- Rodriguez-Torres in 2013
- Born: December 12, 2002; Miami, Florida
- Died: May 28, 2013 (aged 10)
- Cause of death: Childhood Cancer (Rhabdomyosarcoma)
- Burial place: Woodlawn Park Cemetery South
- Monuments: Live Like Bella Park- Miami Dade County Public Parks Live Like Bella Way- Street named in honor in SW Miami Dade
- Known for: Inspiring the Live Like Bella movement and foundation
- Parents: Raymond Rodriguez-Torres (father); Shannah Rodriguez-Torres (mother)
- Relatives: Ramon Rodriguez-Torres MD (Grandfather) Rayna Rodriguez-Torres (Sister)
- Website: www.LiveLikeBella.org

Bella Rodriguez-Torres (December 2002 – May 2013) was a Miami resident ten-year-old girl who died after suffering from cancer for six years.

== Biography ==
Bella was born in Miami, Florida, in 2002 to Raymond Rodriguez-Torres and Shannah Rodriguez-Torres. Due to periventricular leukomalacia caused by low oxygen at birth she suffered developmental delays. Despite this, she was a seemingly physically healthy four-year-old when, in 2007, at the age of four, she became paralyzed overnight without warning.

Bella was diagnosed with stage four alveolar rhabdomyosarcoma in July 2007 with widespread metastases.

She experienced six cancer recurrences and underwent multiple surgical interventions after her diagnosis. Bella received treatment at Miami Children's Hospital, Memorial Sloan Kettering Cancer Center, MD Anderson Cancer Center, Nemours Children's Clinic and University of Florida Proton Therapy Institute. Her family began soliciting prayers via social media. In September 2012, Bella and her mother organized a Band-Aid Drive, which donated over 3,000 colorful children's band-aids to Miami Children's Hospital patients, after Bella had requested an Angry Birds band-aid.

== Legacy and #LiveLikeBella movement ==
Throughout Bella's illness her family were motivated to help other children like her. Early in her diagnosis, her aunt and godmother Kim Rodriguez-Torres founded a ministry: "Bella's Blankets of Blessings" in Bella's honor which sends prayer blankets to people in need around the world.

On the evening of her death, May 28, 2013, LeBron James and Dwyane Wade, then of the Miami Heat, honored Bella by writing #LiveLikeBella on their shoes during the NBA Eastern Conference basketball finals vs the Indiana Pacers.

In 2013, a sixteen-block stretch of Southwest 107th Avenue was renamed Live Like Bella Way.

That year, the Live Like Bella Childhood Cancer Foundation was founded by Bella's family: Shannah Rodriguez-Torres (mother), Raymond Rodriguez-Torres (father), and Rayna Rodriguez-Torres (sister), to help children with cancer.

The foundation advocates for childhood cancer research, provides cancer treatment support to families, and helps families cover the costs of memorial services. Live Like Bella has raised millions to help families in the US and other countries.

In 2010, Bella’s father wrote a book entitled Why Not Me? A True Story about a Miracle in Miami about Bella's story, translated into Spanish as ¿Por Qué No Yo?

In 2014, Miami-Dade Parks and Miami-Dade Commission Vice Chair Lynda Bell unveiled Live Like Bella Park, formerly Leisure Lakes Park.

In 2015, the Live Like Bella Foundation partnered with Baptist Health South Florida to establish the Live Like Bella Pediatric Proton Radiation Oncology Program at the Miami Cancer Institute.

In 2015, Bella's father and Miami Police officers completed a 300-mile bicycle ride from Miami to Walt Disney World in Orlando, Florida, in Bella's memory and to raise funds for childhood cancer research.

Live Like Bella has hosted yearly 5k races to raise awareness of childhood cancer.

In 2018, The Florida Legislature established the Live Like Bella Pediatric Cancer Research Initiative established in section 381.922, Florida Statutes. The Florida Legislature specified the purpose of the Initiative as to advance progress toward curing pediatric cancer through grants awarded through a peer-reviewed, competitive process. The Initiative provides grants for research to further the search for cures for pediatric cancer by pursuing the following goals:

1. Significantly expand pediatric cancer research capacity in Florida.

2. Improve research and treatment through greater pediatric enrollment in clinical trial networks.

3. Reduce the impact of pediatric cancer on disparate groups

Live Like Bella hosts an annual Pediatric Cancer Research Symposium.

In 2024, Bella's father, Raymond Rodriguez-Torres, delivered a TEDx talk: Tragedy to Triumph – Live Like Bella, which was viewed millions of times on YouTube.

In 2024, a documentary, Live Like Bella: A Story of Faith, Hope, and Love, was produced by Christopher Columbus High School in Miami, Florida. It chronicles Bella's story of her six-year struggle with paralysis and rhabdomyosarcoma, and the movement and foundation it inspired.

== Recognition and media coverage ==
Bella Rodriguez-Torres and the Live Like Bella movement received attention from local and national media, including The Miami Herald, CBS Miami, and NBC 6 South Florida.

During the 2013 NBA Eastern Conference Finals, Miami Heat players LeBron James and Dwyane Wade wrote "#LiveLikeBella" on their sneakers in her honor.

In 2018, the Florida Legislature established the Live Like Bella Pediatric Cancer Research Initiative in section 381.922 of the Florida Statutes, to expand pediatric cancer research capacity in the state and honor her legacy.

In 2024, her story was retold in the documentary Live Like Bella: A Story of Faith, Hope, and Love, produced by Christopher Columbus High School in Miami, Florida. That same year, her father, Raymond Rodriguez-Torres, delivered the TEDx talk Tragedy to Triumph: Live Like Bella, which became one of the most viewed TEDx talks worldwide in 2024.

Bella’s life and legacy continue to be referenced in discussions of pediatric cancer awareness and family advocacy within the state of Florida and beyond.

== See also ==
- Childhood cancer
- Rhabdomyosarcoma
- Miami Heat
- Miami, Florida
- TEDx
