= Embryonal rhabdomyosarcoma =

Most common soft-tissue cancer in children

- Specialty: Oncology

Embryonal rhabdomyosarcoma (ERMS) is a rare histological form of cancer in the connective tissue wherein the mesenchymally-derived cells (rhabdomyoblasts) resemble the primitive developing skeletal muscle of the embryo. It is the most common soft tissue sarcoma occurring in children. Embryonal rhabdomyosarcoma is also known as PAX-fusion negative or fusion-negative rhabdomyosarcoma, as tumors of this subtype are unified by their lack of a PAX3-FOXO1 fusion oncogene (or other PAX fusions seen in alveolar rhabdomyosarcoma). Fusion status refers to the presence or absence of a fusion gene, which is a gene formed from joining two different genes together through DNA rearrangements. These types of tumors are classified as embryonal rhabdomyosarcoma because of their "remarkable resemblance to developing embryonic and fetal skeletal muscle."

== Classification ==
Embryonal rhabdomyosarcoma is the more common of the two major sub-types of rhabdomyosarcoma. ERMS accounts for 60-70% of rhabdomyosarcoma, the other being alveolar rhabdomyosarcoma (ARMS), also known as PAX-fusion positive or fusion-positive rhabdomyosarcoma. Most often, ERMS is found in children during ages 0 to 5 years old; however, ERMS can develop throughout any stage of life. Embryonal rhabdomyosarcoma can be further divided into three subcategories: the botryoid, spindle cell, and not-otherwise-specified (NOS). These two subtypes of rhabdomyosarcoma, ERMS and ARMS, also are caused by different genetic mutation pathways.

The Horn-Enterline classification uses morphologic characteristics to divide rhabdomyosarcoma into the embryonal, alveolar, botryoid, and pleomorphic subtypes. However, due to recent advancements in molecular genetics, the genetic and epigenetic factors contributing to these morphological differences have been more closely examined. As a result, the World Health Organization currently takes into account both molecular genetics and morphology to classify rhabdomyosarcoma into the embryonal, alveolar, spindle cell/sclerosing, and pleomorphic subtypes.

When examining embryonal rhabdomyosarcoma tumors vs. alveolar rhabdomyosarcoma tumors, a 2013 study had discovered that there were more rates of mutation in ERMS tumors. The study had use whole genome sequencing to sequence the DNA from 16 RMS tumors and found that RAS pathway mutations tend to be more associated with intermediate and high-risk embryonal Rhabdomyosarcoma. Additionally, embryonal rhabdomyosarcoma tends to be more common in males versus females, with an occurrence of 1.4:1.

=== Histology ===
Embryonal rhabdomyosarcoma has been informally classified as a "small round blue cell tumor" because of the characteristic microscopic appearance of its cells after histological staining with hematoxylin and eosin. Histologically, embryonal rhabdomyosarcoma commonly presents as alternating loose and dense patches of cells, including round cell and spindle cell components. The heterogenous structure resembles striated muscle at various embryonal developmental stages.

=== Location ===
Embryonal rhabdomyosarcoma can develop in soft tissues throughout the body; however, it is commonly found in the "head and neck area or in the genital or urinary organs" The botryoid variant of ERMS occurs in mucosal-lined organs such as the common bile duct, bladder, and vagina. The etymology for this variant name comes from "grape clusters", referring to the gross appearance of grape-like masses.

== Epidemiology of RMS ==
RMS has a higher incidence of affecting males compared to females. Embryonal rhabdomyosarcoma is the most common in young children but there has been report of a second age peak in adolescence years.

=== United States ===
As the most common form of soft tissue sarcoma, RMS affects around 4.5 people per million individuals under the age of 20 in the United States. From 1975 to 2005 in the United States, there is a lower incidence rate of rhabdomyosarcoma and better five-year survival rates in Native Indian/Alaskan Native/Asian/Pacific Islander children compared to white or black children; however, Native Indian/Alaskan Native/Asian/Pacific Islander make up only 6.5% of the total population studied.

=== Global ===
The incidence of RMS in Europe is similar to that of the United States, while the incidence in some parts of Asia is half of the United States.

== Etiology ==
Embryonal rhabdomyosarcoma results from copy number alterations as well as mutations in the RAS pathway. Genomic patterns associated with ERMS include the gains in chromosomes 8, 2, 11, 12, 13, and 20 and losses in chromosomes 10 and 15. Another common genomic alteration is loss of heterozygosity at chromosome 11p, the short arm of chromosome 11. It is believed that some of the identifying genetic mutations that can cause ERMS include p53 loss, RAS pathway activation, MYOD1 mutations. Patients in the fusion-negative group had different genetic mutation profiles than those in the fusion-positive group.

Focusing on the fusion negative population, it was shown that the most fusion-negative tumors were caused by RAS isoform mutations. Approximately 50% of ERMS is associated with RAS mutations, with NRAS mutations more common in adolescent cases and HRAS and KRAS mutations occurring in 70% of infant cases. Embryonal rhabdomyosarcoma is commonly driven by a mutation in the RAS family of proto-oncogenes, creating a powerful signal which is now known to promote tumor growth by preventing muscle lineage progression by blocking expression of the transcription factor myogenin. Inhibition of this signaling pathway with a cancer medication, trametinib, has been recently shown to overcome this differentiation block and reduce tumor progression in animal models of embryonal rhabdomyosarcoma.

Tumor suppressor gene mutations, such as TP53 mutations, were shown in about 13% in the mutations and MYOD1 mutations were seen in about 3% of the mutations. Tumor suppressors signal the cell to stop the cell cycle and start apoptosis, known as programmed cell death, when the cell senses damage or irregular cell cycle growth patterns. Approximately 10% of ERMS cases include a loss of function mutation at TP53, which results in anaplasia, poor cellular differentiation that can be identified through nuclei that are larger and darker-colored than normal. An international study of more than 600 people with RMS showed worst outcomes in cases with anaplasia, regardless of fusion-status.

=== Predisposing conditions ===
Genetic conditions such as Gorlin syndrome, neurofibromatosis type 1, Beckwith-Wiedemann syndrome, Li-Fraumeni syndrome, Noonan syndrome, Costello syndrome, and DICER1 syndrome have been shown to predispose individuals to embryonal rhabdomyosarcoma. Risk factors associated with embryonal rhabdomyosarcoma include cigarette smoking, older age of birth parent, x-ray exposure, and maternal drug use. Of note, the development of Noonan syndrome, Costello syndrome, and neurofibromatosis type 1 are RASopathies, associated with mutations in the RAS cell signaling pathway. ERMS caused by genetically inherited mutations cannot be morphologically distinguished from spontaneously acquired ERMS.

== Diagnosis ==
Rhabdomyosarcoma is diagnosed through the presence of embryonic myogenesis, or skeletal muscle formation, which can be identified through morphological examination as well as assays containing myogenic markers. Immunohistochemical assays use protein expression to determine the fusion status of the growth, differentiating fusion-negative rhabdomyosarcoma from fusion-positive rhabdomyosarcoma. In the recent years, there has been a shift to use molecular classification over histological classification as histology alone does not predict the fusion type of rhabdomyosarcoma. The performance of molecular genetic tests as well as matching the genotypic result to the clinical presentation are necessary to confirm the diagnosis of rhabdomyosarcoma as well as identify a subtype.

=== Immunochemistry ===
Fusion-status is determined through the expression of certain proteins that indicate muscle differentiation, or immunomarkers, although the specific assay panel used for diagnosis depends on the tumor morphology. These immunomarkers include desmin, muscle-specific actin, Myogenin, and MyoD1, the latter two being transcription factors that are involved in muscle differentiation. Embryonal rhabdomyosarcoma can be classified by its lack of PAX3–FOXO1 or PAX7–FOXO1 gene fusions, but approximately 20% of alveolar rhabdomyosarcomas are also determined to be fusion-negative. However, it is suggested that these "fusion-negative" ARMS may be a misclassification of embryonal rhabdomyosarcomas with predominantly dense morphology. The World Health Organization recommends considering "fusion-negative" ARMS as a "primitive form of ERMS". In either case, "fusion-negative" alveolar rhabdomyosarcoma have similar clinical presentation and outcome as embryonal rhabdomyosarcoma, thus risk stratification, prognosis, and treatment intensity of rhabdomyosarcoma are now determined by fusion-status instead of histological classification.

=== Imaging ===
After a physical exam, formal diagnosis of RMS in adult patients requires a computed tomography (CT) scan, which can assess the areas affected and to delineate the tumor. In children, physicians may opt for magnetic resonance imaging (MRI) to limit radiation exposure in younger populations. In the majority of individuals diagnosed with rhabdomyosarcoma, more than half are diagnosed before the age of 10.

== Prognosis ==
The prognosis for rhabdomyosarcoma has improved greatly in recent decades, with over 70% of people surviving for five years after diagnosis. The combined use of radiotherapy and surgery has significantly reduced the mortality rates compared to patients who did not undergo any radiotherapy or chemotherapy treatments. The five-year survival rate of embryonal rhabdomyosarcoma is 82%, which is better than that of alveolar rhabdomyosarcoma (53%). This may be due to the more aggressive and metastatic nature of ARMS that can be attributed to its PAX3–FOXO1 or PAX7–FOXO1 gene fusions. Nevertheless, some embryonal rhabdomyosarcoma patients with a rare Leu122Arg mutation in MYOD1 gene have a very poor outcome. In two different studies, none of the subjects with the MYOD1 mutation survived. Tumors due to this mutation commonly manifest in the head and neck area, causing the mutated protein to behave like an oncogene.

There have not been many studies linking the genetic profile and clinical outcome of ERMS. However, in "A Report From an International Consortium", the authors analyzed patient data from the Children's Oncology Group (COG) and European paediatric Soft tissue sarcoma Study Group (EpSSG), hoping to identify and analyze any relationship between clinical outcomes and genetic mutations. The study consisted of 641 patients with sufficient data to analyze.

Contrary to previous research, the findings of this study suggest that having RAS isoform mutations did not necessarily equate to a poor development of the disease. However, a pattern was found between the RAS isoform mutation seen and one's stage in life; HRAS isoform in infants, KRAS isoform in toddlers, and NRAS isoform in adolescence. This clinical study also found similar results as previous studies with the correlation of TP53 mutations and clinical outcome. TP53 mutations tended to result in a worsening development and clinical outcome of the disease. Although MYOD1 mutations make up a small percentage of ERMS, these mutations have been seen to have a negative prognosis and more studies should be conducted to understand how to treat the clinical condition of this specific mutation.

=== Tumor location ===
Tumor location plays an important role as RMS located in the parameningeal area, retroperitonium, pelvic, vulva, uterus, vagina, or trunk area generally have poor prognosis. The anatomical position of parameningeal RMS makes it difficult to completely resect the entire tumor via surgery and may lead to tumor recurrence. Additionally, imaging that shows a tumor greater than 5 cm, presence of metastases, or positive lymph node status can indicate poor prognosis. People that have more distant tumors—tumors that have spread to distant parts away from the primary site—have higher mortality rate when compared to people with only localized tumors.

=== Age of diagnosis ===
In a 2020 case study of 464 adolescents aged 0–19 years diagnosed with rhabdomyosarcoma between 1988 and 2016, children who were diagnosed between the ages of 5 and 9 years had the most promising prognosis. In contrast, infants less than 1 year old had the worst outcome, which may be associated with the lower doses of chemotherapy and radiotherapy administered and naive immune system.

== Treatment ==
Treatment for embryonal rhabdomyosarcoma involves the use of combination therapy consisting of chemotherapy, surgery, and/or radiation therapy. In order to create an optimal treatment plan for the individual, therapy is often based upon risk stratification (low, intermediate, or high risk) based on an individual's disease stage, size of tumor, progression of disease, surgery resection, age at diagnosis, and site of tumor. In the US, a combination of Vincristine, Actinomycin D, and cyclophosphamide are often the chemotherapeutics used to treat rhabdomyosarcoma. In contrast, the regimen in Europe utilizes Vincristine, Actinomycin D, and ifosfamide. When the US and European regimen were studied side by side, the two regimens were comparable in terms of efficacy outcomes. Radiation therapy continues to be an integral component of rhabdomyosarcoma treatment; however, the long-term safety and treatment related complications remain a concern. Advancement in the use of radiation therapy includes using three-dimensional conformal radiation therapy (3D-CRT) to create a three-dimensional image of tumor so providers can determine the dose of radiation per patient while limiting radiation exposure to normal tissues. Techniques such as multi-field optimization (MFP) allows for more precise distribution of proton beams.

=== Treatment plan ===
- The first line of treatment for most people is surgery or resection of the tumor(s). The surgery involves removing the primary tumor and any tissue that may be infected with cancer cells. Resection of the tumor tends to be more favorable in cancers that have not yet metastasized. In the case that the tumor cannot be removed, the cancer can be treated with a combination of radiation and chemotherapy instead. In the majority of people, the surgery cannot remove all traces of the cancer and chemotherapy/radiation will be required as further treatment to eradicate any remaining cancer.
- Chemotherapy is given in the US as a medication regimen abbreviated VAC, consisting of Vincristine, Actinomycin D, and Cyclophosphamide. The chemotherapy works to kill all the remaining cancer cells and to stop future growth of any possible cancerous cells. Safety concerns regarding the long term effects of chemotherapy remains a concern. Side effects of the VAC regimen include nausea, vomiting, liver damage, and immune system suppression. The length and dosing of the chemotherapy is oftentimes on a case-by-case basis based on the person's stage of cancer, site of tumor and age.
- Radiation therapy utilizes high doses of radiation in order to kill the cancer cells. Most people are given external beam radiation therapy which is radiation given from a machine outside of the body. The number of radiation treatments are based on the person's progression of disease. Side effects of radiation therapy include tiredness, skin irritation, and gastrointestinal issues.

=== Localized rhabdomyosarcoma ===
In individuals with localized rhabdomyosarcoma, surgery and radiation therapy are primarily used to eliminate the tumor. Localized rhabdomyosarcoma can typically be treated successfully with the current standard of care and survival outcomes.

=== Metastatic rhabdomyosarcoma ===
In individuals with metastatic rhabdomyosarcoma, combination therapy is not able to treat specific sites such as bone marrow or the lungs. Treatment for metastatic rhabdomyosarcoma has not changed over the last three decades and five-year survival outcomes in those with high-risk rhabdomyosarcoma remain less than 40%. In terms of overall survival, metastatic rhabdomyosarcoma remains at 21% while recurrent rhabdomyosarcoma remains at 30%. In a European study on 174 adolescents with metastatic rhabdomyosarcoma, high dose chemotherapy compared to standard chemotherapy did not show a statistical difference in five-year overall survival rates. In fact, those who received the high dose chemotherapy had experienced an increase in adverse events such as myelosuppression, peripheral neuropathy and later required a dose reduction. In individuals with more resistant rhabdomyosarcoma, more targeted therapies and immunotherapies in clinical trials have been of interest to gain better survival outcomes and reduce toxicities and treatment resistance.
