= List of biological development disorders =

The following is a list of terms used to describe biological disorders of development, arranged by root word and shared prefix:

Biological development disorders (cellular, tissue and organic)
Feature	Absence	Deficit	Increase	Transformation	Normal
Primordium (congenital development)	Agenesis	Dysgenesis	-	-
Plasia (cell formation)	Aplasia, anaplasia	Hypoplasia, dysplasia, retroplasia	Hyperplasia, neoplasia, proplasia, prosoplasia	Heteroplasia, metaplasia, desmoplasia	Euplasia
Plastia (remodeling)	Aplastia	Displastia	-	Heteroplastia	-
Trophy (growth rates)	Atrophy	Hypotrophy, Dystrophy	Hypertrophy, pseudohypertrophy	-	Eutrophy
Trophic (stimulates growth)	Atrophic	Hypotrophic, dystrophic	Hypertrophic	-	Eutrophic
Typia (quality or peculiarity)	Atypia	-	-	-	Ortotypia
Soma (body living matter)	-	Microsomia	Macrosomy, macrosomia	-	-
-	-	-	-	-	-
Others:

== Bibliography ==
- Reece, JB; Urry, LA; Cain, ML; Wasserman, SA; Minorsky, PV; Jackson, RB (2014). Campbell Biology (10th ed.). Addison Wesley Longman. ISBN 978-0321834959.
