= Desmoplastic fibroma =

- Specialty: Oncology

In medicine, a desmoplastic fibroma is a low-grade malignant, locally aggressive, fibrous and rare tumor of the bone, affecting children and young adults, potentially resulting in cortical bone destruction. It usually affects craniofacial bones, mandible most frequently, long bones (metaphyseal femur, tibia, humerus). The World Health Organization, 2020, reclassified these tumors as specific benign tumors in the category of fibroblastic and myofibroblastic tumors.

Although it does not tend to metastatize, it has a high local recurrence and infiltrative growth. Treatment consists in wide local excision to prevent otherwise frequent recurrences. The role of radiotherapy and chemotherapy in this tumor still is unclear.

Some cases have been described, in which an osteosarcoma has arisen from a desmoplastic fibroma.

A famous occurrence of this particular form of the disease involved Italo-Australian Riccardo Torresan in 2011, with 18 cm of femur needing to be removed with the now widely recognized method of "aggressive curettage" being employed.

== See also ==
- Desmoplasia
