= Dystrophy =

Any disease involving degeneration of tissue

Dystrophy is the degeneration of tissue, due to disease or malnutrition, most likely due to heredity.

== Types ==
- Muscular dystrophy
  - Duchenne muscular dystrophy
  - Becker's muscular dystrophy
  - Myotonic dystrophy
- Reflex neurovascular dystrophy
- Retinal dystrophy
- Cone dystrophy
- Corneal dystrophy
- Lipodystrophy
- Nail dystrophy

== See also ==
- Muscle weakness
- Muscle atrophy
- Myotonia
- List of biological development disorders
