= PAX7 =

Paired box transcription factor protein

Identifiers
- Aliases: PAX7, HUP1, PAX7B, RMS2, Pax7, paired box 7, MYOSCO
- External IDs: OMIM: 167410; MGI: 97491; GeneCards: PAX7

Gene location (Human)
Chr.	Chromosome 1 (human)
Band	1p36.13	Start	18,630,846 bp
Band	1p36.13	End	18,748,866 bp

Gene location (Mouse)
Chr.	Chromosome 4 (mouse)
Band	4 D3|4 70.83 cM	Start	139,464,373 bp
Band	4 D3|4 70.83 cM	End	139,560,839 bp
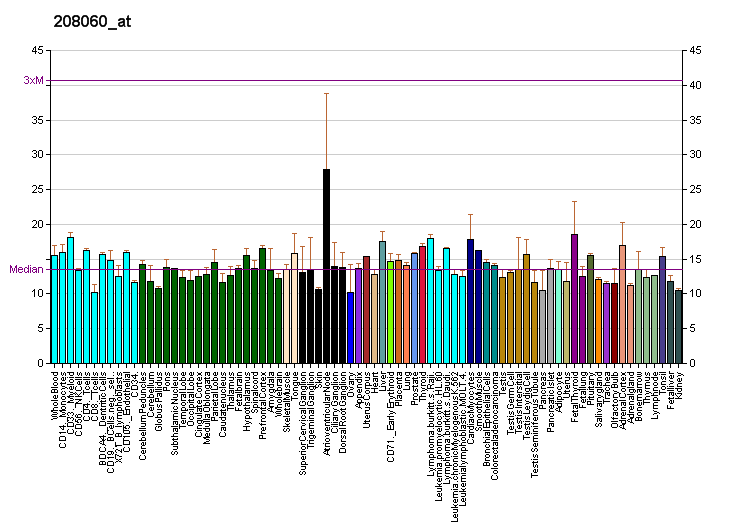
RNA expression pattern
Bgee	Human / Mouse (ortholog); Top expressed in: olfactory zone of nasal mucosa; nasal epithelium; muscle of thigh; testicle; gastrocnemius muscle; prefrontal cortex; skeletal muscle tissue; Brodmann area 9; right frontal lobe; cingulate gyrus / Top expressed in: superior colliculus; somite; dorsal tegmental nucleus; urethra; pretectal area; main bronchus; pituitary gland; hair; nasal placode; lateral nasal prominence; More reference expression data
BioGPS	More reference expression data
Gene ontology
Molecular function	sequence-specific DNA binding; DNA binding; DNA-binding transcription factor activity; RNA polymerase II general transcription initiation factor activity; DNA-binding transcription factor activity, RNA polymerase II-specific
Cellular component	nucleus
Biological process	positive regulation of myoblast proliferation; regulation of cell fate commitment; chromatin remodeling; regulation of transcription, DNA-templated; spinal cord association neuron differentiation; positive regulation of histone methylation; anatomical structure morphogenesis; muscle organ development; negative regulation of apoptotic process; transcription, DNA-templated; embryonic skeletal system development; multicellular organism development; cartilage development; skeletal muscle tissue regeneration; muscle tissue morphogenesis; regulation of gene expression; neuron fate commitment; skeletal muscle satellite cell commitment; dorsal/ventral neural tube patterning; regulation of protein binding; skeletal muscle tissue development; positive regulation of transcription by RNA polymerase II; transcription by RNA polymerase II; regulation of DNA binding
Sources:Amigo / QuickGO
Orthologs
Databases	NCBI: entry; OMA: entry
Species	Human	Mouse
Entrez	5081	18509
Ensembl	ENSG00000009709	ENSMUSG00000028736
UniProt	P23759	P47239
RefSeq (mRNA)	NM_013945; NM_001135254; NM_002584	NM_011039
RefSeq (protein)	NP_001128726; NP_002575; NP_039236	NP_035169
Location (UCSC)	Chr 1: 18.63 – 18.75 Mb	Chr 4: 139.46 – 139.56 Mb
PubMed search
- Wikidata
View/Edit Human	View/Edit Mouse

Paired box protein Pax-7 is a protein that in humans is encoded by the PAX7 gene.

== Function ==
Pax-7 plays a role in neural crest development and gastrulation, and it is an important factor in the expression of neural crest markers such as Slug, Sox9, Sox10 and HNK-1. PAX7 is expressed in the palatal shelf of the maxilla, Meckel's cartilage, mesencephalon, nasal cavity, nasal epithelium, nasal capsule and pons.

Pax7 is a transcription factor that plays a role in myogenesis through regulation of muscle precursor cells proliferation. It can bind to DNA as an heterodimer with PAX3. Also interacts with PAXBP1; the interaction links PAX7 to a WDR5-containing histone methyltransferase complex By similarity. Interacts with DAXX too.

PAX7 functions as a marker for a rare subset of spermatogonial stem cells, specifically a sub set of A_{single} spermatogonia. These PAX7^{+} spermatogonia are rare in adult testis but are much more prevalent in newborns, making up 28% of germ cells in neonate testis. Unlike PAX7^{+} muscle satellite cells, PAX7^{+} spermatogonia rapidly proliferate and are not quiescent. PAX7^{+} spermatogonia are able to give rise to all stages of spermatogenesis and produce motile sperm. However, PAX7 is not required for spermatogenesis, as mice without PAX7^{+} spermatogonia show no deficits in fertility.

PAX7 may also function in the recovery in spermatogenesis. Unlike other spermatogonia, PAX7^{+} spermatogonia are resistant to radiation and chemotherapy. The surviving PAX7^{+} spermatogonia are able to increase in number following these therapies and differentiate into the other forms of spermatogonia that did not survive. Additionally, mice lacking PAX7 had delayed recovery of spermatogenesis following exposure to busulfan when compared to control mice.

== Clinical significance ==
Pax proteins play critical roles during fetal development and cancer growth. The specific function of the paired box gene 7 is unknown but speculated to involve tumor suppression since fusion of this gene with a forkhead domain family member has been associated with alveolar rhabdomyosarcoma. Alternative splicing in this gene has produced two known products but the biological significance of the variants is unknown. Animal studies show that mutant mice have malformation of maxilla and the nose.

== See also ==
- Pax genes
