= Small-blue-round-cell tumor =

Cancerous tumors composed of small cells which stain blue

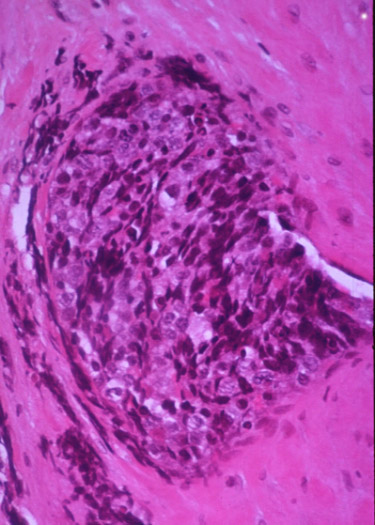
Small blue round cells of Ewing Sarcoma

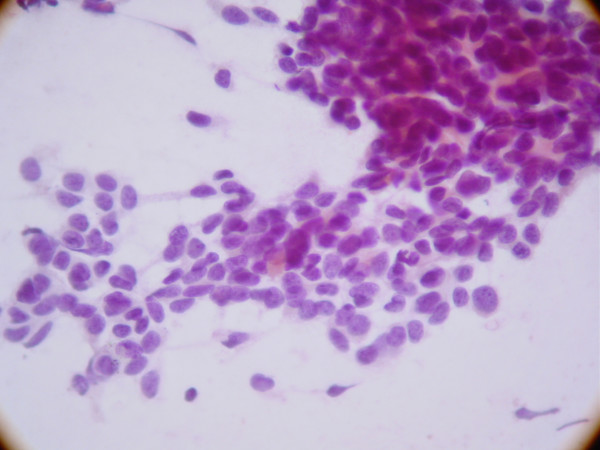
Display of small round blue cells characteristic of desmoplastic small round cell tumour.

In histopathology, a small-blue-round-cell tumour (abbreviated SBRCT), also known as a small-round-blue-cell tumor (SRBCT) or a small-round-cell tumor (SRCT), is any one of a group of malignant neoplasms that have a characteristic appearance under the microscope, i.e. consisting of small round cells that stain blue on routine H&E stained sections.

These tumors are seen more often in children than in adults. They typically represent undifferentiated cells. The predominance of blue staining is because the cells consist predominantly of nucleus, thus they have scant cytoplasm.

== Examples ==
Tumors that belong to this group are:

- Desmoplastic small-round-cell tumour
- Ewing sarcoma/PNET
- Neuroblastoma
- Medulloblastoma
- Rhabdomyosarcoma
- Synovial sarcoma
- Carcinoid tumor
- Mesothelioma
- Small cell lung cancer
- Wilms' tumour
- Retinoblastoma
- Small-cell lymphoma
- Hepatoblastoma- only the anaplastic form has round blue cells, the more common fetal and embryonal types do not
- Merkel cell carcinoma
- Mesenchymal chondrosarcoma

== Conditions mimicking SBRCT ==
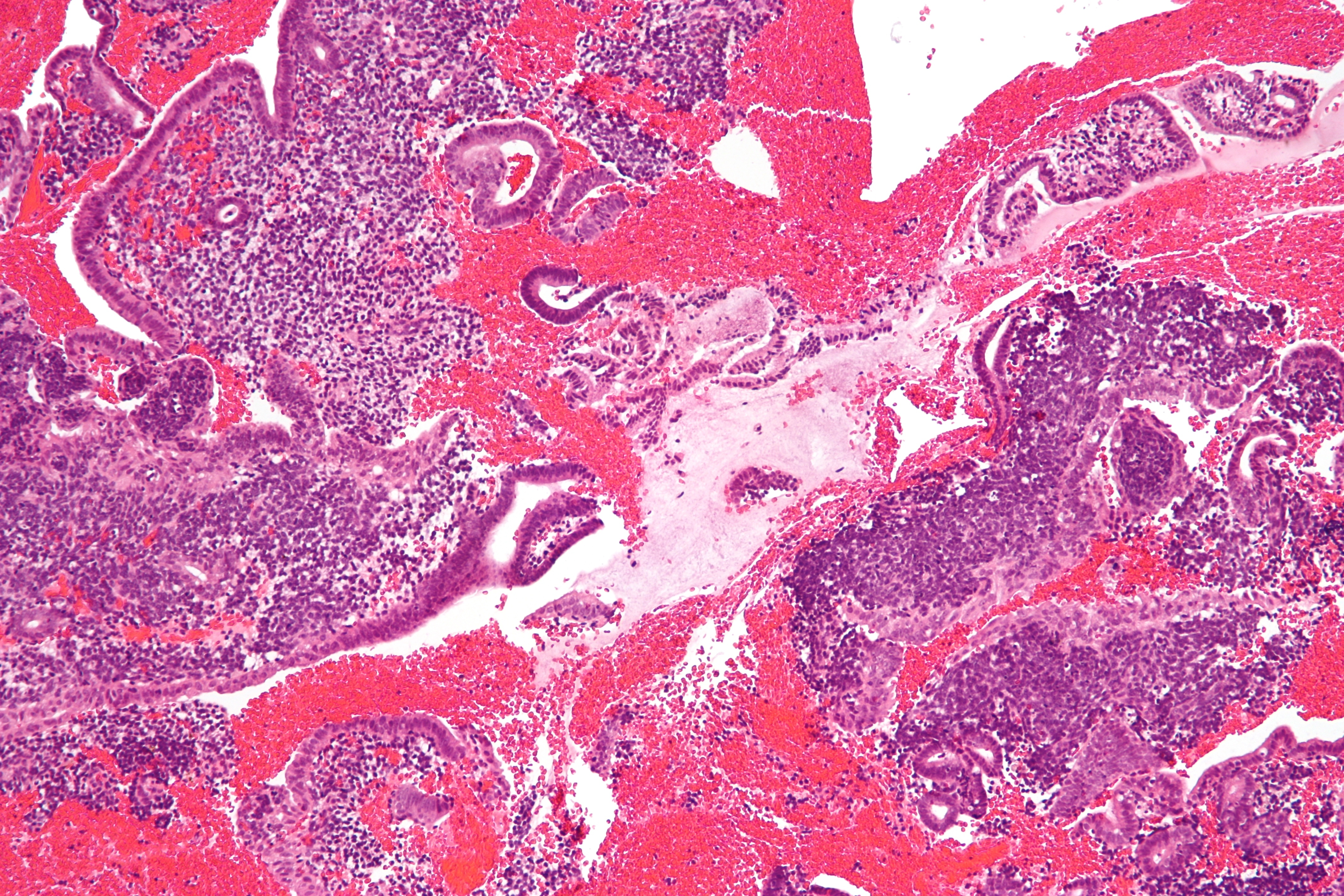
Endometrial stromal condensation may mimic a small-blue-round-cell tumour.

Endometrial stromal condensation may mimic a small-blue-round-cell tumour.
