= Cyclin D2 =

Protein-coding gene in humans

CCND2

Identifiers
- Aliases: CCND2, KIAK0002, MPPH3, cyclin D2
- External IDs: OMIM: 123833; MGI: 88314; GeneCards: CCND2

Gene location (Human)
| Chr. | Chromosome 12 (human) |
| Band | 12p13.32 | Start | 4,269,771 bp |
| Band | 12p13.32 | End | 4,305,353 bp |

Gene location (Mouse)
| Chr. | Chromosome 6 (mouse) |
| Band | 6 F3|6 61.92 cM | Start | 127,125,162 bp |
| Band | 6 F3|6 61.92 cM | End | 127,152,193 bp |
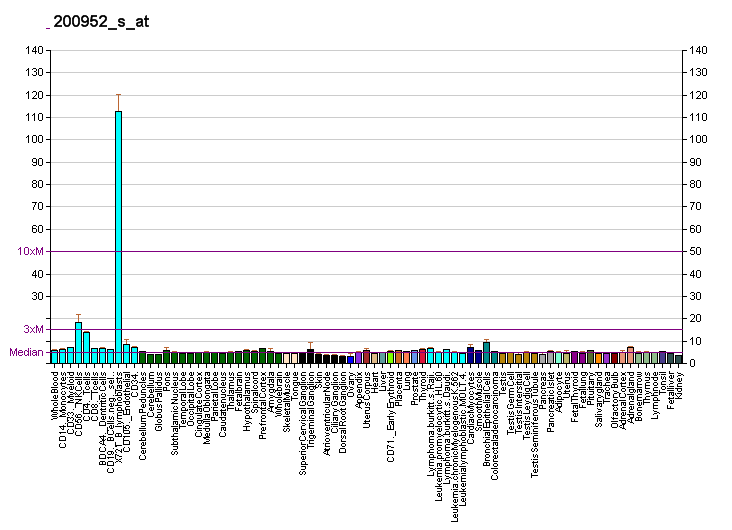

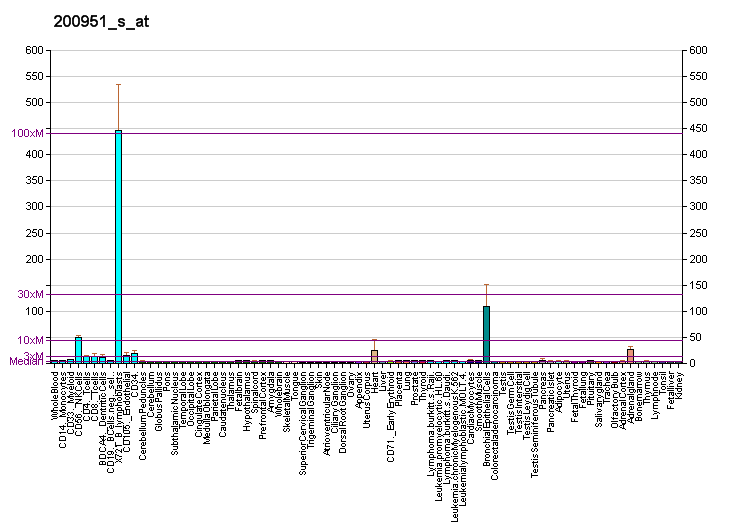

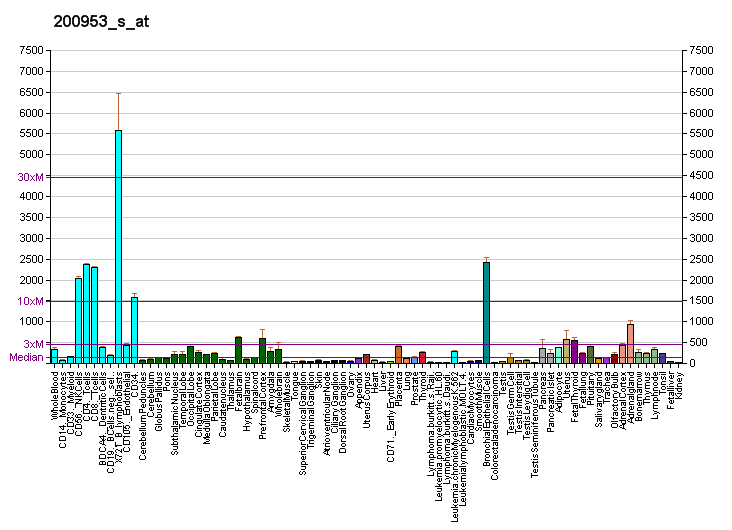
RNA expression pattern
| Bgee | Human / Mouse (ortholog); Top expressed in: seminal vesicula; tail of epididymis; ventricular zone; ganglionic eminence; cardiac muscle tissue of right atrium; myocardium of left ventricle; corpus epididymis; epithelium of colon; caput epididymis; tendon of biceps brachii / Top expressed in: Rostral migratory stream; calvaria; medial ganglionic eminence; hand; otic placode; vas deferens; hair follicle; maxillary prominence; Paneth cell; iris; More reference expression data |
| BioGPS | More reference expression data |
Gene ontology
| Molecular function | protein binding; protein kinase binding; protein kinase activity; cyclin-dependent protein serine/threonine kinase regulator activity |
| Cellular component | cytoplasm; cytosol; chromatin; cyclin-dependent protein kinase holoenzyme complex; nuclear membrane; nucleolus; membrane; nucleus; nucleoplasm; cyclin D2-CDK4 complex |
| Biological process | cell cycle; positive regulation of protein phosphorylation; positive regulation of cyclin-dependent protein serine/threonine kinase activity; regulation of cell cycle; cell division; positive regulation of cell population proliferation; positive regulation of G1/S transition of mitotic cell cycle; negative regulation of apoptotic process; long-term memory; adult locomotory behavior; cellular response to X-ray; regulation of cyclin-dependent protein serine/threonine kinase activity; mitotic cell cycle; protein phosphorylation; regulation of mitotic nuclear division; positive regulation of cell cycle; mitotic cell cycle phase transition |
Sources:Amigo / QuickGO
Orthologs
| Databases | NCBI: entry; OMA: entry |
| Species | Human | Mouse |
| Entrez | 894 | 12444 |
| Ensembl | ENSG00000118971 | ENSMUSG00000000184 |
| UniProt | P30279 | P30280 |
| RefSeq (mRNA) | NM_001759 | NM_009829 |
| RefSeq (protein) | NP_001750 | NP_033959 |
| Location (UCSC) | Chr 12: 4.27 – 4.31 Mb | Chr 6: 127.13 – 127.15 Mb |
| PubMed search |
- Wikidata
| View/Edit Human | View/Edit Mouse |

G1/S-specific cyclin-D2 is a protein that in humans is encoded by the CCND2 gene.

== Function ==
The protein encoded by this gene belongs to the highly conserved cyclin family, whose members are characterized by a dramatic periodicity in protein abundance through the cell cycle. Cyclins function as regulators of cyclin-dependent kinases. Different cyclins exhibit distinct expression and degradation patterns which contribute to the temporal coordination of each mitotic event. This cyclin forms a complex with and functions as a regulatory subunit of CDK4 or CDK6, whose activity is required for cell cycle G1/S transition. This protein has been shown to interact with and be involved in the phosphorylation of tumor suppressor protein Rb. Knockout studies of the homologous gene in mouse suggest the essential roles of this gene in ovarian granulosa and germ cell proliferation. High level expression of this gene was observed in ovarian and testicular tumors.

== Clinical significance ==
Mutations in CCND2 are associated to megalencephaly-polymicrogyria-polydactyly-hydrocephalus syndrome.
