= Alveolar rhabdomyosarcoma =

Type of skeletal muscle tumor

- Specialty: Oncology

Alveolar rhabdomyosarcoma (ARMS) is a subtype of the rhabdomyosarcoma family of soft-tissue cancers whose lineage derives mesenchymal stem cells, the progenitors of skeletal muscle cells. ARMS tumors resemble the alveolar tissue in the lungs. Tumor location varies from patient to patient, but is commonly found in the head and neck region, male and female urogenital tracts, the torso, and extremities.

Two fusion proteins can be associated with ARMS but are not necessary for oncogenesis: PAX3-FKHR (now known as FOXO1) and PAX7-FKHR. In children and adolescents, ARMS accounts for about 1 percent of all malignancies, has an incidence rate of 1 per million, and generally occurs sporadically, with no genetic predisposition. PAX3-FOXO1 is now known to drive cancer-promoting gene expression programs through creation of distant genetic elements called super-enhancers.

== Genetics ==
There is no genetic predisposition for developing ARMS, but there are a few genetic recombination events that occur to cause the fusion protein to be synthesized. In order to have the PAX3-FOXO1 fusion there needs to be a recombination event that translocates part of chromosome 13 to chromosome 2, and for PAX7-FOXO1 fusion there must be a translocation of part of chromosome 13 to chromosome 1. The 2;13 translocation reciprocal is often balanced and not amplified, while the 1;13 translocation reciprocal is sometimes viewed as balanced and sometimes not, so it is often amplified. The PAX7-FOXO1 fusion is often amplified in tumors (about 70 percent of all PAX7-FOXO1 fusion positive tumors) and the PAX3-FOXO1 fusion is rarely amplified (only in 5 percent of all PAX3-FOXO1 fusion positive tumors). About 60 percent of all ARMS cases are positive for PAX3-FOXO1 fusion gene, 20 percent are positive for PAX7-FOXO1 fusion gene, and the remaining 20 percent are fusion negative ARMS cases. Both fusion genes are composed of either the PAX3 or PAX7 DNA binding domains and the FOXO1 transactivation domain. This fusion causes a dysregulation of transcription and acts as an oncogene promoting cancer formation.

== Pathology ==
ARMS cells are often small with little cytoplasm. The nuclei of the cells are round, with normal, dull chromatin. The ARMS cells often clump together and have fibrovascular septa that interrupt the aggregates. The fibrovascular septa that disrupt the aggregates often give the tumor the physiology of the alveoli found in the lungs. In a few cases, there may not be any fibrovascular septa, and this gives the tumor a more solid phenotype and no alveolar physiology. Immunostaining for myogenin and for MyoD can be used to differentiate ARMS from other rhabdomyosarcoma tumors, and immunostaining for AP2β and p-cadherin can distinguish fusion-positive ARMS from fusion-negative.

=== Embryonic origin and epidemiology ===
ARMS usually occurs in skeletal muscles and is thought to arise from precursor cells within muscle tissue. During embryonic development, ARMS occurs in the mesoderm, which is the precursor for the skeletal muscle tissue. ARMS accounts for approximately 20 to 30 percent of all rhabdomyosarcoma tumors and about 1 percent of cancers in children and adolescents. There is an age determination on which PAX proteins fuse with the FOXO1 transcription factor. The PAX3-FOXO1-positive subtype of ARMS mostly occurs in older children and young adults, while the PAX7-FOXO1-positive variant and fusion-negative subsets are more common in younger children.

=== Clinical ===
ARMS usually occurs in the skeletal muscle tissue of the extremities, but it is still very common in the torso, head, and neck regions. The primary tumor often presents as a soft, painless mass, but it can be detected when it begins to compress other structures at the primary site. A large fraction of patients who are diagnosed with ARMS, roughly 25–30 percent, will have metastases at the time of diagnosis. The standard sites for metastases to form are the bone marrow, the bones, and distal nodes. Typical treatment options for patients who have been diagnosed with ARMS include standard surgery, radiation therapy, and intensive chemotherapy.

== Prognosis ==
Patients who have been diagnosed with ARMS often have poor outcomes (with metastasis, it is often worse). The four-year survival rate without remission for local ARMS tumors is 65 percent, while the four-year survival rate with metastatic ARMS is only 15 percent. Patients who have metastatic ARMS positive with PAX3-FOXO1 fusion often have a poorer outcome than patients positive with PAX7-FOXO1 fusion, with a four-year survival rate of 8 percent and 75 percent, respectively. Other variables affect the four-year survival rate, such as primary tumor site, size of primary tumor, amount of local invasion, number of distal lymph nodes spread to, and whether metastasis has occurred. Prognosis for patients who have primary tumor sites within the bones often has higher survival rates and responds well to treatment options. While patients who have primary tumor sites within the nasopharynx region with metastases to the breast have very poor outcomes. Patients who are fusion protein negative with low risk clinical features should be treated with reduced therapy, while patients who are fusion protein positive with low risk clinical features should be treated as an intermediate risk and have more intensive therapy regimens.

== See also ==
- FOXO genes
- Oncology
- Pax genes
