= Fork head domain =

DNA-binding protein domain found in transcription factors

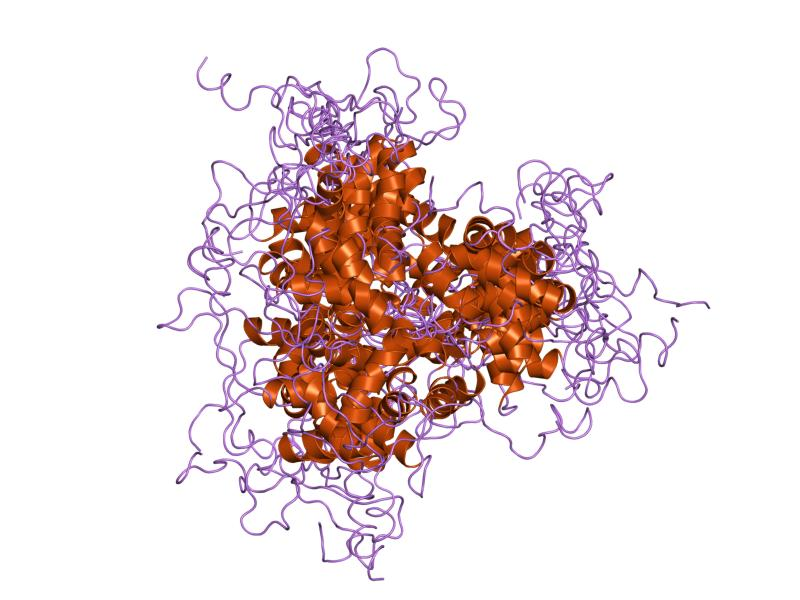
- Structure of the winged helix protein Genesis.

Identifiers
- Symbol: Fork_head
- Pfam: PF00250
- InterPro: IPR001766
- SMART: SM00339
- PROSITE: PDOC00564
- SCOP2: 2hfh / SCOPe / SUPFAM
- CDD: cd00059
Available protein structures:
- Pfam: structures / ECOD
- PDB: RCSB PDB; PDBe; PDBj
- PDBsum: structure summary
- PDB: 1d5v, 1e17, 1jxs, 1kq8, 2a3s, 2c6y, 2d2w, 2hdc, 2hfh

The fork head domain is a type of protein domain that is often found in transcription factors and whose purpose is to bind DNA.

== Function ==
The fork head protein of Drosophila melanogaster, a transcription factor that promotes terminal rather than segmental development, contains neither homeodomains nor zinc-fingers characteristic of other transcription factors. Instead, it contains a distinct type of DNA-binding region, containing around 100 amino acids, which has since been identified in a number of transcription factors (including D. melanogaster FD1-5, mammalian HNF3, human HTLF, Saccharomyces cerevisiae HCM1, etc.). This is referred to as the fork head domain but is also known as a "winged helix". The fork head domain binds B-DNA as a monomer, but shows no similarity to previously identified DNA-binding motifs. Although the domain is found in several different transcription factors, a common function is their involvement in early developmental decisions of cell fates during embryogenesis. Members of the class O of forkhead box transcription factors (FoxO) have important roles in metabolism, cellular proliferation, stress tolerance and probably lifespan.

== See also ==
- FOX proteins
