= Neurula =

Embryo at the early stage of development in which neurulation occurs

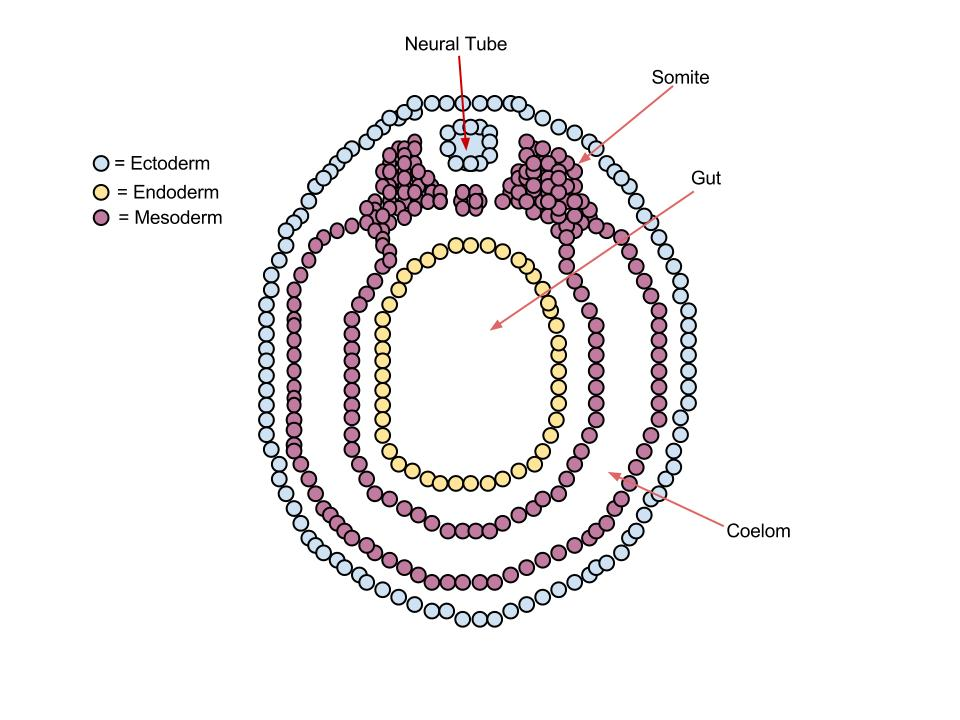
Cross section of a vertebrate embryo in the neurula stage

A neurula is a vertebrate embryo at the early stage of development in which neurulation occurs. The neurula stage is preceded by the gastrula stage; consequentially, neurulation is preceded by gastrulation. Neurulation marks the beginning of the process of organogenesis.

Mice, chicks, and frogs are common experimental models for studying the neurula. Depending on the species, embryos reach the neurula stage at different time points and spend a varying amount of time in this stage. For oviparous organisms, incubation temperature also affects the length of neurulation. In addition to development of the neural tube, other processes occur in a neurula stage embryo depending on the species. For example, in reptiles, extra-embryonic membrane tissues become distinct from the embryo.

The neurula embryo has five regions of mesoderm that surround the neural tube. Anterior mesoderm develops into the head region, while posterior mesoderm develops into the trunk. Various molecules, including proteoglycans in the extracellular matrix, and genes, including Pax transcription factors, are essential for the development and closure of the neural tube in the neurula stage embryo.

== Neurulation ==
Neurulation is a process in vertebrate embryos at the neurula stage in which the neural tube is formed. There are two types of neurulation: primary and secondary neurulation. Primary neurulation refers to the formation and inward folding of the neural plate upon itself to form the neural tube. In secondary neurulation, the neural tube forms via the merging of cavities in the medullary cord. In amphibians and reptiles, primary neurulation forms the whole neural tube, and the neural tube closes simultaneously along its length. Contrarily, in fish, secondary neurulation forms the neural tube. Both primary and secondary neurulation occur in birds and mammals, although with slight differences. Primary neurulation occurs in the cranial and upper spinal regions, which gives rise to the brain and upper regions of the spinal cord. Secondary neurulation occurs in the lower sacral and caudal regions, resulting in the formation of the lower regions of the spinal cord. In birds, the neural tube closes anterior to posterior, while in mammals, the middle closes first, followed by the closure of both ends.

== Developmental timing ==
The point at which the embryo reaches the neurula stage differs among species, while for oviparous organisms, the length of neurulation is additionally affected by incubation temperature. In general, the lower the temperature, the greater the length of neurulation. Chick embryos reach the neurula stage on day 2 post-fertilization, and they undergo neurulation up to day 5. Reptiles, including crocodiles, lizards, and turtles, tend to spend a longer time in the neurula stage. A typical frog embryo, incubated at 18 °C, is an early stage neurula by 50 hours post-fertilization and a late stage neurula by 67 hours. The mouse embryo begins neurulation on day 7.5 of gestation and remains in the neurula stage until day 9.

== Morphology ==
The mesoderm of a vertebrate embryo in the neurula stage can be divided into five regions. Ventral to the neural tube is the chordamesoderm. Lateral to either side of the neural tube is the paraxial mesoderm, while the intermediate lateral region to the neural tube is the intermediate mesoderm. The fourth region is the lateral plate mesoderm, and the last region is the head mesenchym. Anterior portions of the mesoderm develop into rostral regions of an organism, such as the head, while posterior mesoderm develops into caudal regions, such as the trunk or tail. The paraxial mesoderm, also termed somitic mesoderm, develops into somites, blocks of tissue that occur in a segmental pattern. Somites, in turn, give rise to vertebrae, ribs, skeletal muscle, cartilage, tendons, and skin.

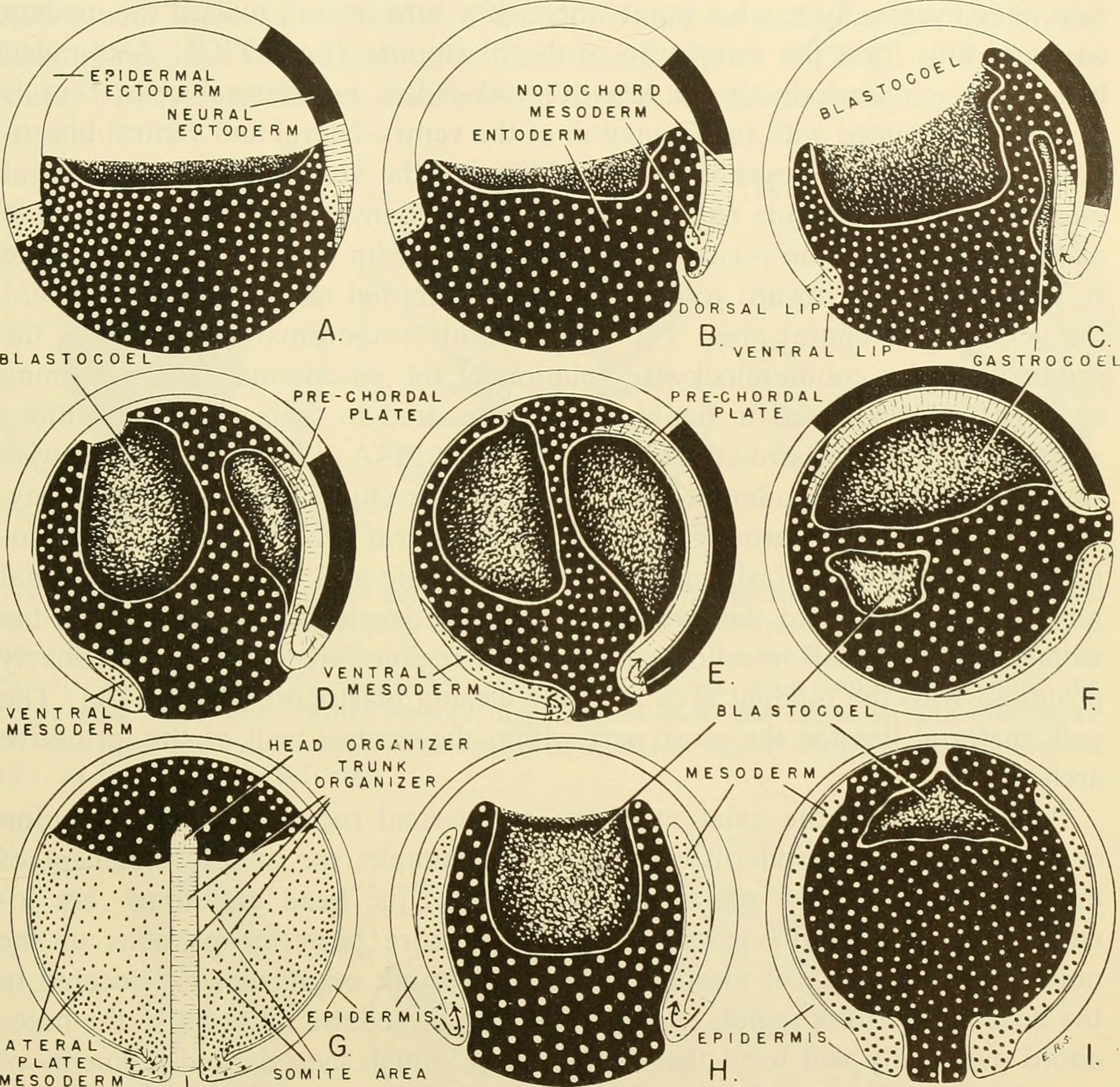
Transition from the gastrula stage to the neurula stage

In Xenopus laevis, the transition from the gastrula to the neurula involves morphological changes in two regions surrounding the blastopore: the dorsal involuting marginal zone (IMZ) and the overlying non-involuting marginal zone (NIMZ) of the gastrula. Following involution at the mid-gastrula stage, the IMZ undergoes convergent extension, in which the lateral regions narrow and move towards the midline and the anterior end lengthens. This has the effect of narrowing the blastopore. The NIMZ, which does not involute, simultaneously extends in the opposite direction and at a greater rate to cover regions no longer occupied by the IMZ. The convergent extension of the IMZ and NIMZ begins in the second half of gastrulation and continues into the late neurula stage. Eventually, deep tissue of the IMZ forms the central notochord and the surrounding paraxial mesoderm. By the early neurula stage, the notochord is clearly distinguished. Notochordal cells become arranged in a formation representing a stack of coins in a process termed circumferential intercalation. The superficial layer of the IMZ develops into the roof of the archenteron, or the primitive gut, while the underlying endoderm forms the archenteron floor. The NIMZ develops into a structure resembling the early neural tube. The outer ectodermal layer of the neurula is formed by uniform expansion of the cells at the animal pole, known as the animal cap. The ectoderm then differentiates into neural and epidermal tissue.

In reptilian embryos, beginning in the late-stage neurula and carrying over into the early stages of organogenesis, extra-embryonic membrane tissues comprising the yolk sac, chorion, and amnion become distinct from the tissues of the embryo. The mesoderm splits to create the extra-embryonic coelom, which consists of two layers. The vascularized mesoderm-endoderm inner layer, termed the splanchnopleure, develops into the yolk sac, while the nonvascularized ectoderm-mesoderm outer layer, termed the somatopleure, becomes the amnion and chorion. During organogenesis, these three extra-embryonic tissues become fully developed. Additionally, within the reptilian neurula, tissues of the brain begin to differentiate and the heart and blood vessels start to form.

== Chemical composition ==
Mouse neurula tissues divide rapidly, with an average cell cycle lasting 8–10 hours. Proteoglycans in the extracellular matrix (ECM) of neurula-stage cells play an important role in promoting functional cranial neurulation and neural fold elevation; hyaluronic acid (HA) is synthesized and becomes accumulated, while the cell maintains a low level of sulfated glycosaminoglycans (GAGs). HA is involved in creation of biconvex neural folds, while sulfated GAGs are critical in manipulating the neural groove into a V-shape, as well as in neural tube closure. The ECM does not play a major role in spinal neurulation due to the close-packed nature of the mesodermal cells in the spinal region, which allows little intercellular space. Additionally, actin-containing microfilaments are believed to be necessary in cranial neurulation. They may act as the mechanism for neural folding, or they may stabilize neural folds that have already formed; however, their exact role has not been determined. There is some evidence that growth factors, such as insulin or transferrin, also play a role in neurulation, but this link has not been well-studied.

== Gene activation ==
A variety of genes have been found to be expressed in the neurula stage embryo. Different genes are activated for different neurulation events, such as those occurring in separate regions of the developing neural tube. These genes are necessary for proper neurulation and closure of the neural tube. Signaling molecules such as Wnts, FGFs, and BMFs along with the transcription factors that include Msx, Snails, Sox8/9/10, and Pax3/7 genes play key roles in neural crest formation.

Pax transcriptional factors have an important role in early development, especially with regards to the CNS and neural crest. Pax3 and Pax7 are promoters of both neural crest cell survival along with promoting environmental stress resistance. In mouse embryos Pax3 blocks the tumor suppressor gene p53, which is necessary for controlled proliferation and genomic stability, is expressed in all cells of the neurula. During early development Pax3 is expressed at the posterior and lateral area of the neural plate, the same region that the neural crest arises from. Neural crest defects were found to occur in mouse and human Pax3 mutants, indicating an importance of functionality. Within chicks, frogs and fish Pax3/Pax7 are activated by Wnt and FGF signaling. Pax3 and Pax7 are also required for neural crest induction after depletion of the two genes resulted in the lack of activation of the specific neural crest genes Snail2 and Foxd3, which didn't allow further development or emigration of neural crest. Using knockouts has been helpful for understanding the role and functions of several genes found in the neurula. For example, Wnt-1 was found to have no role in the closing of the neural plate, despite being present at the tip of the neural folds when it is closing. Though mutants of Wnt-1 does lead to pattern defects within the brain. Notch1 is involved with formation of somites. HNF-3 is needed for development of the notochord and node. The gene Apolipoprotein B, which is involved in transporting and metabolizing fat soluble molecules in the blood, is expressed in the yolk sac and fetal liver. Within the neurula in Xenopus laevis, development genes Xwnt-3 and Xwnt-4 are present.
