= Waardenburg syndrome type 2D =

Medical condition

- This condition is inherited in an autosomal recessive manner
- Causes: mutation in SLUG(SNAI2) gene

Waardenburg syndrome type 2D, a subtype of the Waardenburg syndrome, is a rare congenital disorder caused by a mutation in the SLUG (SNAI2) gene. It is characterized by the lack of pigmentation in the skin, hair, and eyes as well as the abnormalities in the outer wall of the cochlea. This subtype lacks the wide distance between the eyes, known as dystopia canthorum, that is observed in most patients with Waardenburg syndrome. Those affected, exhibit varying degrees of deafness or complete hearing loss along with heterochromia and reports of early graying. This disease is observed in the neonatal stages of early life.

== Presentation ==
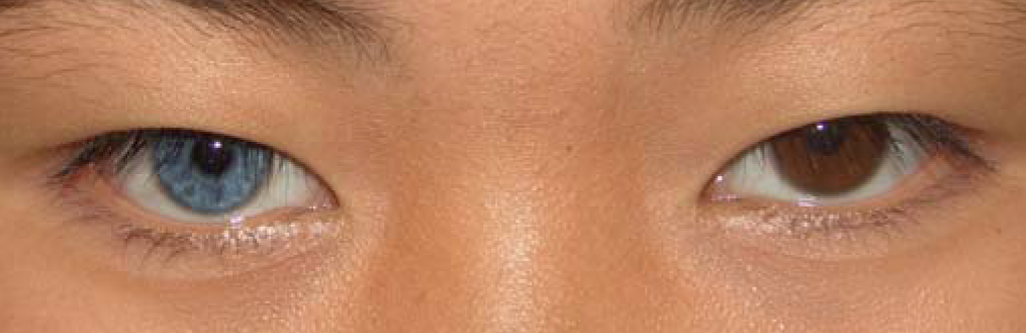
A patient displaying heterochromia as a symptom of type 2D Waardenburg syndrome. The patient also lacks the dystopia canthorum which distinguishes them from type 1 patients.

Type 2 of the Waardenburg syndrome is defined by the abnormalities of auditory function and pigmentation in the hair, skin, and eyes as well as progressive hearing loss in some cases. It also results in heterochromia, where the eyes are different colors, in about half of those affected by type 2. Type 2 also contains variation of possible genetic causes, some of which are caused by a mutation in microphthalmia associated transcription factor (also known as MITF) as well as SOX10 genes. Type 2D is distinguished from other types through the absence of dystopia canthorum, meaning that the wide distance between the canthi of the eyes present in other types is not seen in patients with type 2D. And it is the only subtype of the Waardenburg syndrome with autosomal recessive inheritance.

== Genetics ==
Type 2D is inherited in an autosomal recessive manner, therefore both parents of those affected carry the recessive gene. Those who carry the one copy of the gene do not display any symptoms of the disease.

Type 2D specifically has been discovered to be caused by a mutation in the SLUG gene, which is zinc finger protein also identified as SNAI2. The SNAI2 gene is located on chromosome 8q11 and made up of three different exons. The gene is responsible for pigmentation in mice which aligns with the human homolog. The mice without the SLUG gene present displayed dysfunction in the neural crest in addition to pigmentation abnormalities. The products of the gene are active in the migratory cells in the neural crest during development. Not only this function is present, but also evidence has shown to interact with the MITF gene that is responsible for various Waardenburg syndrome types.

SNAI2 plays a major role in the migration of neural crest cells but does not take part in their formation. It is also expressed in multiple parts of the body during early development including chondrocytes, mesenchymal parts in the lungs, guts, and kidneys.

The deletion of this SNAI2 has been studied in two very diverse patients. The patients studied for the subtype 2D were both screened and showed deletion of both copies of the SLUG gene, displaying evidence of these mutations to the symptoms in the Waardenburg syndrome type 2D.

== Diagnosis ==
In general, Waardenburg syndrome has five major criteria, which are as follows: congenital hearing loss, iris pigmentation abnormality, hair pigmentation abnormality, dystopia canthorum, and a relative with the Waardenburg syndrome. However, as mentioned earlier type 2D does not show any signs of dystopia canthorum. Therefore, in order for an individual to be diagnosed with two of the major criteria beside dystopia canthorum they need to display other major symptoms. There is often misdiagnosis between type 1 and type 2 of the Waardenburg syndrome due to such close similarities between the observed phenotype. There are some minor signs as well including leukoderma, synophrys, broad or high nasal bridge, and nostrils hypoplasia.

== Management ==
There is no current treatment for the Waardenburg syndrome, however it is recommended to visit counselors to adapt to everyday life. Hearing loss may present some difficulties for the patients. Other symptoms that may arise to those with the syndrome, listed as minor criteria, could be treated such as hyperplasia and leucoderma and should be treated as appropriate.

== History ==
Two patients were studied for type 2D that shared the same genetic mutation in the SLUG gene. The patients from different backgrounds, the first patient is a 15-year old Bangladeshi female and the second is a 3-year old Dutch boy. The first patient presented with hearing loss and no other symptoms and the rest of her family reported no similar symptoms. The second patient also reported hearing loss and heterochromia. Family history indicated no other members were affected by the mutation. These patients both had deletions in the SLUG gene, SNAI2 and MIFT gene as well, all of which play major roles in early neural crest development.
