= ABCD syndrome =

Medical condition

- Specialty: Genetics

Albinism-black lock-cell migration disorder (known by the initialism ABCD syndrome) is a condition affecting a person's physical appearance and physiology: (1) A – albinism, (2) B – black lock of hair, (3) C – cell migration disorder of the neurocytes of the gut, and (4) D – sensorineural deafness. The syndrome is caused by mutation in the endothelin B receptor gene (EDNRB).

== Presentation ==
In the beginning, medical officials defined ABCD syndrome by the four key characteristics of the syndrome. In the first case study of the Kurdish girl, researchers described her as having "albinism and a black lock at the right temporo-occipital region, long Blaschko lines, her eyelashes and brows were white, the irises in her eyes appeared to be blue, she had spots of retinal depigmentation, and she did not react to noise." The albinism is interesting in this diagnosis because the skin of an affected individual is albino pale besides the brown patches of mispigmented skin. The "black locks" described and seen in clinical pictures of the infants are thick patches of black hair above the ears that form a half circle reaching to the other ear to make a crest shape.

As identified in this first case study and stated in a dictionary of dermatologic syndromes, ABCD syndrome has many notable features, including "snow white hair in patches, distinct black locks of hair, skin white except brown macules, deafness, irises gray to blue, nystagmus, photophobia, poor visual activity, normal melanocytes in pigmented hair and skin, and absent melanocytes in areas of leukoderma." Individuals have the blue/gray irises typical of people affected by blindness. The C of ABCD syndrome is what distinguishes this genetic disorder from BADS and it involves cell migration disorder of the neurocytes of the gut. This characteristic occurs when nerve cells do not function correctly in the gut, which results in aganglionosis i.e. Intestines’ failure to move food along the digestive tract. Deafness or being unresponsive to noise due to very low quality of hearing was reported in every case of ABCD syndrome. The characteristics of ABCD syndrome are clearly evident in an inflicted individual.

No longer considered a separate syndrome, ABCD syndrome is today considered to be a variation of Shah-Waardenburg type IV. Waardenburg syndrome (WS) is described as "the combination of sensorineural hearing loss, hypopigmentation of skin and hair, and pigmentary disturbances of the irides." Hearing loss and deafness, skin mispigmentation and albinism, and pigmentary changes in irises are the similarities between WS and ABCD. According to a dictionary of dermatologic syndromes, Waardenburg syndrome has many notable features, including "depigmentation of hair and skin – white forelock and premature graying of hair, confluent thick eyebrows, heterochromic irides or hypopigmentation of iris, laterally displaced inner canthi, congenital sensorineural deafness, broad nasal root, autosomal dominant disorder, and other associated findings, including black forelocks."

== Causes ==
Researchers in the past 20 years have determined that a gene mutation, specifically a homozygous mutation in the EDNRB gene, is the cause of ABCD syndrome. The advancement of technology led to new DNA material testing methods and this discovery changed the view of ABCD syndrome completely. A homozygous mutation means that there was an identical mutation on both the maternal and paternal genes. The identifying clinical report stated the test was done by scanning the Kurdish family for mutations in the EDNRB gene and the EDN3 gene by using a test called denaturing gradient gel electrophoresis. The electrophoresis test takes advantage of electrical currents and differences in melting points of fragments of DNA or RNA to move them based on their molecular weight; the differences in mobility of the fragments then can be analyzed to determine different sequences and to detect individual alleles. Different nucleotides in DNA are codes for certain proteins, which are formed by different patterns of the base pairs adenine, thymine, guanine, and cytosine. The combination of adenine and thymine and guanine and cytosine align on the double strands of DNA. The test results found "an aberrant DGGE pattern of exon 3 of the EDNRB gene. The mutation was determined to be a homozygous C to T base pair transition at the amino acid level, causing a premature stop in gene translation." This specialized testing enables geneticists to recognize the gene mutation that is the cause of ABCD syndrome.

New findings introduced an important break in the beliefs about ABCD syndrome because the endothelin B gene is a gene involved in Shah-Waardenburg syndrome. The endothelin receptor B produces Waardenburg syndrome type IV. Discovering that the same gene is involved in both ABCD and Waardenburg syndrome was important because researchers could look further into ways to fix this crucial gene.

== Diagnosis ==
The occurrence of WS has been reported to be one in 45,000 in Europe. The diagnosis can be made prenatally by ultrasound due to the phenotype displaying pigmentary disturbances, facial abnormalities, and other developmental defects. After birth, the diagnosis is initially made symptomatically and can be confirmed through genetic testing. If the diagnosis is not made early enough, complications can arise from Hirschsprung's disease.

== Screening ==
Screening generally only takes place among those displaying several of the symptoms of ABCD, but a study on a large group of institutionalized deaf people in Columbia revealed that 5.38% of them were Waardenburg patients. Because of its rarity, none of the patients were diagnosed with ABCD (Waardenburg Type IV).

== Treatment ==
If the Hirschsprung's disease is treated in time, ABCD patients live otherwise healthy lives. If it is not found soon enough, death often occurs in infancy. Digestive problems from the colostomy and reattachment may exist, but most cases can be treated with laxatives. The hearing loss, which is usually degenerative, can only be treated with surgery or hearing aids. However, leaving hearing loss untreated may not reduce quality of life.

== History ==
Dutch ophthalmologist Petrus Johannes Waardenburg (1886–1979) brought about the idea of Waardenburg syndrome when he examined two deaf twins. Waardenburg decided to define the syndrome with the six major symptoms that patients most commonly had.

- He defined "lateral displacement of the medial canthi combined with dystopia of the lacrimal punctum and blepharophimosis" referring to people with broader and flatter nasal bridges, which in turn leads to folds in the skin that cover the inner corners of the eye.
- Secondly, people who are born with a "prominent broad nasal root", have a widened area between the eyes, causing them to have a flatter and wider face, along with eyes farther apart than normal.
- Thirdly, "hypertrichosis of the medial part of the eyebrows" is present, meaning excessive hair growth in the patients’ eyebrow region, most likely leading to a unibrow.
- The fourth symptom, "white forelock", was commonly seen as depigmented strands of hair
- "Heterochromia iridis" indicates that the patient has two different colored eyes or two colors in the same eyes.
- "Deaf-mutism": People with the disorder are both deaf and mute.

When scientists further investigated the syndrome, they realized that patients exhibited a wider range of symptoms of this disease in different combinations. This helped them distinguish forms of Waardenburg syndrome. Their evaluation consisted of specifying Waardenburg syndrome type I (WS1), type II (WS2), type III (WS3), and type IV (WS4).

In 1995, a case study was performed of a Kurdish family. Scientists completed a molecular analysis with DNA strands of the patients diagnosed with ABCD syndrome. Their task was to scan the sequences to find a mutation in the EDNRB gene, one of the most important protein-coding genes. When they completed the scan they "found a homozygous C to T transition resulting, at the amino acid level, in a premature stop codon." Then, they went back and defined that Shah-Waardenburg syndrome consisted majorly of "mutations in the ENDRB or END3 gene", along "with [some] SOX10 mutations". Therefore, the researchers confirmed that ABCD syndrome was a form of Shah-Waardenburg syndrome. The genetic tests that they performed on the patients DNA helped in identifying the appropriate diagnosis.

In 2002, Whitkop and other scientists examined patients born with white hair, some black locks, and depigmented skin; he diagnosed them as having black lock albinism deafness syndrome (BADS). Those who were closely working with this case suggested that it was an autoimmune disorder rather than a genetic defect. However, soon after, they had a patient who was one of fourteen children of Kurdish parents. The pedigree they examined revealed autosomal-recessive inheritance which led to cell migration of the neurocytes in the gut and, therefore, they redefined the syndrome as ABCD syndrome. This revealed "a homozygous nonsense mutation in the EDNRB gene" meaning that ABCD syndrome was not a separate entity but rather the same as Shah-Waardenburg syndrome.

== See also ==
- List of cutaneous conditions
