= Waardenburg syndrome type 4A =

- Other names: Shah-Waardenburg syndrome

Waardenburg syndrome type 4A is an extremely rare congenital disorder caused by a mutation in an endothelin receptor gene. It results in common Waardenburg syndrome symptoms such as abnormal hair and skin pigmentation and heterochromia, but also present with symptoms of Hirschsprung's disease. Symptoms include abdominal pain and bowel obstruction. Waardenburg syndrome type 4A is the rarest among the types, appearing only once in about every 1,000,000 individuals. There have only been a total of 50 cases reported in total as of 2016.

== Presentation ==
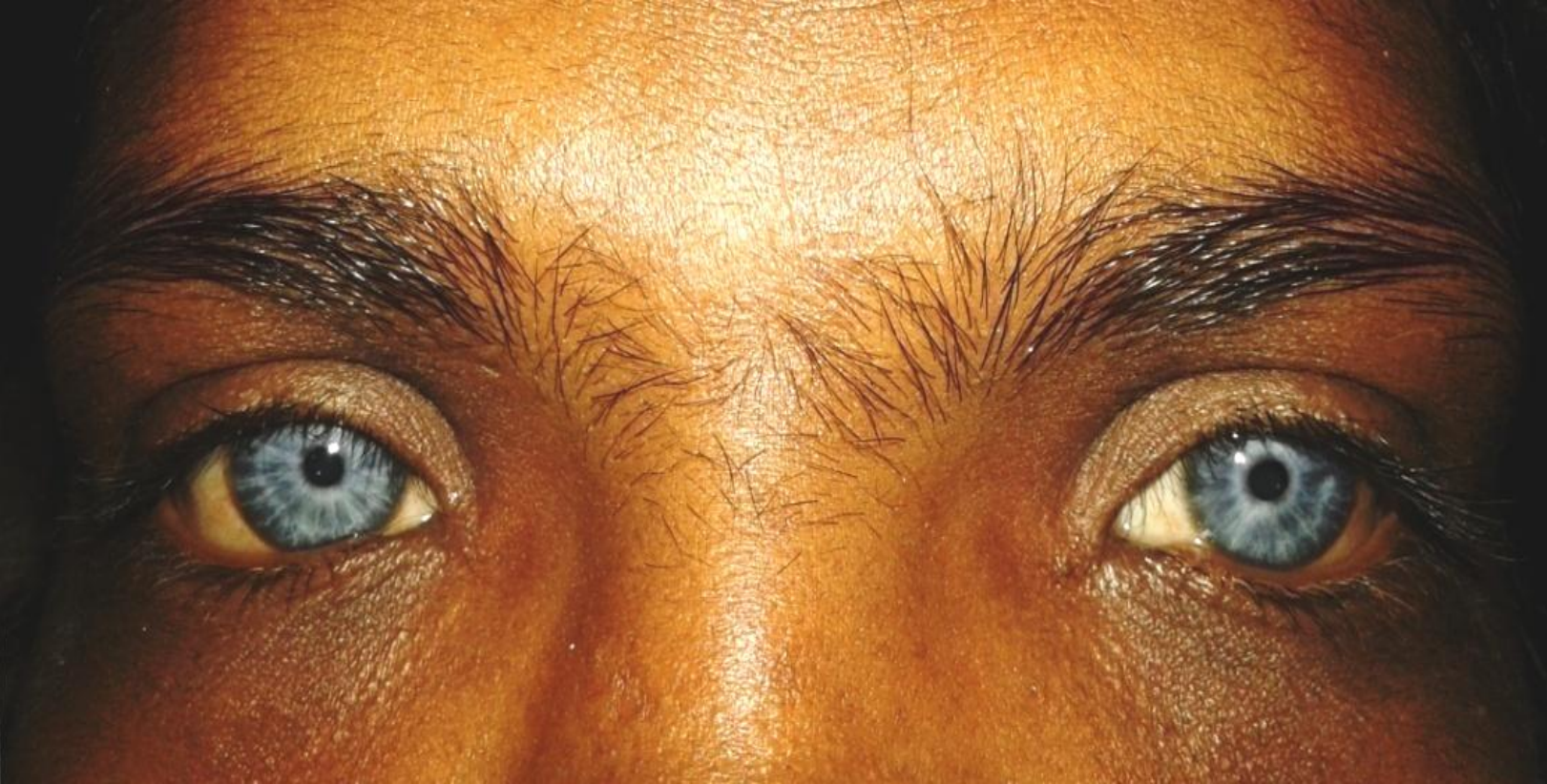
The blue irises seen in the image present a common phenotype seen by patient of type 4A Waardenburg syndrome. However, patients of the Shah-Waardenburg syndrome do not display signs of dystopia canthorum as seen in other types of Waardenburg syndromes.

Similar to other types of Waardenburg syndrome, Shah-Waardenburg syndrome patients present with some facial features such the abnormal pigmentation in the hair and premature graying, observed as white forelock. Their eyes also present abnormal pigmentation such as heterochromia iridis or uncharacteristic blue eyes. The study conducted by Shah reported additional physical features such as white eyebrows and eyelashes as well, which is not seen in other types of Waardenburg syndromes.These patients also lack some key features from the Waardenburg syndrome, noted by the lack of dystopia canthorum, the broad nasal root, as well as the lack of white skin pigmentation around the body. Studies have also shown that hearing loss due to EDNRB mutation such as the ones that cause type 4A, have a 53.3% prevalence in patients.

The biggest difference noted is the additional symptoms caused by the additional HSCR which included intestinal obstruction and colonic aganglionosis. Colonic aganglionic indicates that some of the nerves in the intestines are nonfunctional in the patients, causing abnormal bowel obstruction and abdominal pain to occur. It can also lead to constipation and blockage in the body type 4A leads to early mortality, as observed in the original Shah study, where the 12 infants in question died within 3–38 days after birth.

== Genetics ==
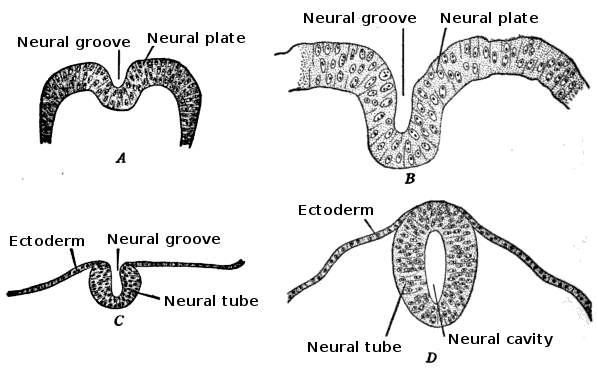
The mutations in the EDNRB gene results in abnormalities in the neural tube and specification of the enteric nervous system precursors that are present in the gut.

Type 4 Waardenburg syndrome is inherited in an autosomal dominant manner, but it has also been reported in recessive autosomal. The mode of inheritance is still unclear, researchers concluded that it depends on the type of mutation that affected the EDNRB gene. The abnormalities seen are caused in mutation such as the studied deletion of the endothelin‐B receptor gene, which is located at chromosome 13q22.1-q31.3. There is some variation in the size of the deletion in some patients studied. The longer deletions actually led to more severe phenotypes such as retardation and bilateral hearing loss.

EDNRB is found in the neural tube early development, and assist in the migration and specification of the enteric nervous system precursors that are present in the gut. The homozygous mutation of this gene results in deafness and abnormal cell migration in the cell as described in the Shah-Waardenburg syndrome. Variation of mutation for the EDNRB gene can be hard to assist appropriately due to low penetrance and variation in dosages of the product. Mutation in both copies of the gene results in full phenotypes presented by patients. On the other hand, heterozygous can display isolated or minor HSCR symptoms rather than Shah-Waardenburg symptoms.

== Diagnosis ==
Physicians assess the patient for the typical phenotypes of Waardenburg syndrome such as the white forelock or heterochromia. But in addition to that, hearing loss is considered as well as side effects of the HSCR disease. That includes multiple issues with the intestines and the gut resulting in symptoms such as constipation or abdominal pain.

== Management ==
Due to the unfortunate early mortality expected with Shah-Waardenburg syndrome, it is essential to detect the symptoms as early as possible. The physical features provided by the phenotypes of Waardenburg syndrome actually work to the benefit of the patient as they work as physical markers for possible detection of the disease. There is no current cure for Waardenburg syndrome, however, the symptoms are managed by a variety of methods. Some of the hearing loss can be addressed by some aid depending on the specific mutation and the patient. Patients are also encouraged to seek specialists to assist and seek resources and methods to manage the disease.

== History ==
Shah-Waardenburg syndrome was first described by Krishnakumar N. Shah in 1981. The discovery focused on 12 babies with abnormal eye pigmentation, white forelock, and exhibited symptoms of Hirschsprung's disease, they presented an unclear relation to Waardenburg syndrome.The babies lacked dystopia canthorum which is the physical marker used to diagnose Waardenburg syndrome. It is unclear if they had suffered from hearing loss since they died in neonatal age before they were able to conduct the test. The combination of the symptoms of Hirschsprung 's disease and Waardenburg was then named Shah-Waardenburg syndrome. The main cause of this syndrome is the mutation of the endothelin receptor type B gene (noted as EDNRB).
