= WS2B =

Putative gene

Waardenburg syndrome, type 2B

Identifiers
- Symbol: WS2B
- NCBI gene: 7488
- HGNC: 12794
- OMIM: 600193

Other data
- Locus: Chr. 1 p21-1p13.3

WS2B is a putative gene associated with Waardenburg syndrome type 2. It has not yet been isolated from its locus of chromosome 1p21–1p13.3 since it was first reported in 1994.

== History ==
This locus was first linked to Waardenburg syndrome in 1994, when the study that first identified mutations in MITF in patients with Waardenburg syndrome type 2 also found that some patients did not have any mutations in this region. A second 1994 study found a link to chromosome 1 in the locus 1p21–p13.3. This became known as type 2B of the condition, however it has not been documented since, and the gene responsible remains unknown.
