= WS2C =

Putative gene associated with Waardenburg syndrome type 2

Waardenburg syndrome, type 2C

Identifiers
- Symbol: WS2C
- NCBI gene: 170594
- OMIM: 606662

Other data
- Locus: Chr. 8 p23

WS2C is a putative gene associated with Waardenburg syndrome type 2. It has not yet been isolated from its locus of chromosome 8p23 since it was first reported in 2001.

== History ==
This locus was first linked to Waardenburg syndrome in 2001, when a study of an Italian family with Waardenburg syndrome type 2 features found that they were due to an unknown gene on chromosome 8 at locus 8q23 which had been broken by a chromosomal translocation. The study established a provisional name for the gene, WS2C. However, mutations in this region in Waardenburg syndrome patients have not been found since.
