= SOX10 =

Transcription factor gene of the SOX family

Identifiers
- Aliases: SOX10, DOM, PCWH, WS2E, WS4, WS4C, SRY-box 10, SRY-box transcription factor 10, SOX-10
- External IDs: OMIM: 602229; MGI: 98358; GeneCards: SOX10

Gene location (Human)
Chr.	Chromosome 22 (human)
Band	22q13.1	Start	37,970,686 bp
Band	22q13.1	End	37,987,422 bp

Gene location (Mouse)
Chr.	Chromosome 15 (mouse)
Band	15 E1|15 37.7 cM	Start	79,039,108 bp
Band	15 E1|15 37.7 cM	End	79,049,440 bp
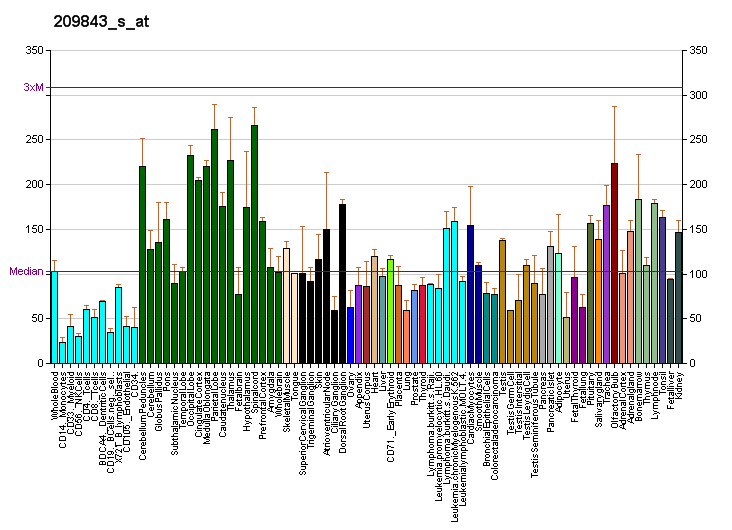

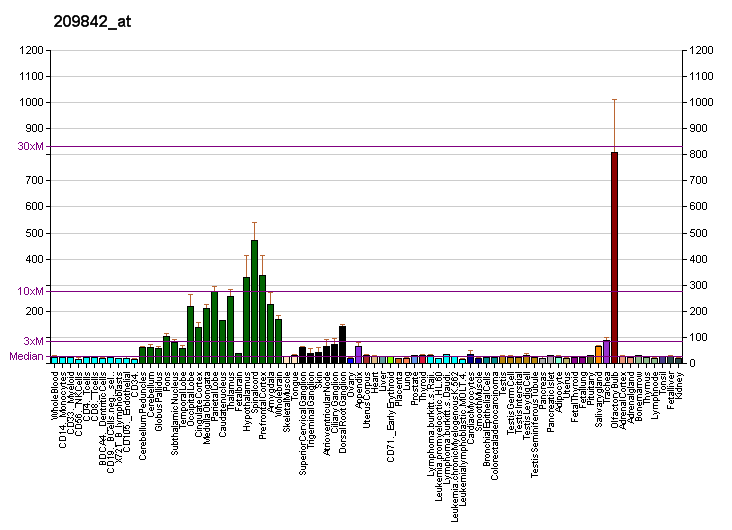
RNA expression pattern
Bgee	Human / Mouse (ortholog); Top expressed in: inferior olivary nucleus; sural nerve; dorsal motor nucleus of vagus nerve; inferior ganglion of vagus nerve; trigeminal ganglion; spinal ganglia; C1 segment; subthalamic nucleus; ventral tegmental area; parotid gland / Top expressed in: vestibular membrane of cochlear duct; neural crest; external carotid artery; motor neuron; parotid gland; internal carotid artery; optic nerve; stria vascularis; vestibular sensory epithelium; lactiferous gland; More reference expression data
BioGPS	More reference expression data
Gene ontology
Molecular function	transcription coactivator activity; transcription factor binding; chromatin binding; protein binding; identical protein binding; promoter-specific chromatin binding; DNA binding; DNA-binding transcription factor activity; DNA-binding transcription factor activity, RNA polymerase II-specific; RNA polymerase II cis-regulatory region sequence-specific DNA binding; DNA-binding transcription activator activity, RNA polymerase II-specific; transcription factor activity, RNA polymerase II distal enhancer sequence-specific binding
Cellular component	cytoplasm; nucleoplasm; nucleus; chromatin; mitochondrion; mitochondrial outer membrane; membrane; extrinsic component of mitochondrial outer membrane
Biological process	regulation of transcription, DNA-templated; regulation of transcription by RNA polymerase II; anatomical structure morphogenesis; transcription, DNA-templated; stem cell differentiation; negative regulation of transcription, DNA-templated; transcription elongation from RNA polymerase II promoter; negative regulation of Schwann cell proliferation; positive regulation of gene expression; positive regulation of myelination; cellular response to progesterone stimulus; positive regulation of transcription, DNA-templated; oligodendrocyte development; central nervous system myelination; oligodendrocyte differentiation; in utero embryonic development; neural crest cell migration; morphogenesis of an epithelium; positive regulation of neuroblast proliferation; central nervous system development; peripheral nervous system development; positive regulation of gliogenesis; cell differentiation; melanocyte differentiation; lacrimal gland development; negative regulation of apoptotic process; positive regulation of transcription by RNA polymerase II; cell maturation; enteric nervous system development; digestive tract morphogenesis; developmental growth; morphogenesis of a branching epithelium; negative regulation of canonical Wnt signaling pathway
Sources:Amigo / QuickGO
Orthologs
Databases	NCBI: entry; OMA: entry
Species	Human	Mouse
Entrez	6663	20665
Ensembl	ENSG00000100146	ENSMUSG00000033006
UniProt	P56693	Q04888
RefSeq (mRNA)	NM_006941	NM_011437
RefSeq (protein)	NP_008872	NP_035567
Location (UCSC)	Chr 22: 37.97 – 37.99 Mb	Chr 15: 79.04 – 79.05 Mb
PubMed search
- Wikidata
View/Edit Human	View/Edit Mouse

Transcription factor SOX-10 is a protein that in humans is encoded by the SOX10 gene.

== Function ==
This gene encodes a member of the SOX (SRY-related HMG-box) family of transcription factors involved in the regulation of embryonic development and determination of cell fate. The encoded protein acts as a transcriptional activator after forming a protein complex with other proteins. This protein acts as a nucleocytoplasmic shuttle protein and is important for neural crest and peripheral nervous system development.

In melanocytic cells, there is evidence that SOX10 gene expression may be regulated by MITF.

== Mutations ==
Mutations in this gene are associated with Waardenburg–Shah syndrome and uveal melanoma.

== Immunostain ==
SOX10 is used as an immunohistochemistry marker, being positive in:

- Neuroectodermal neoplasms of neural crest origin, especially:

- Melanoma, although desmoplastic melanomas may be only focally positive.
- Nevus

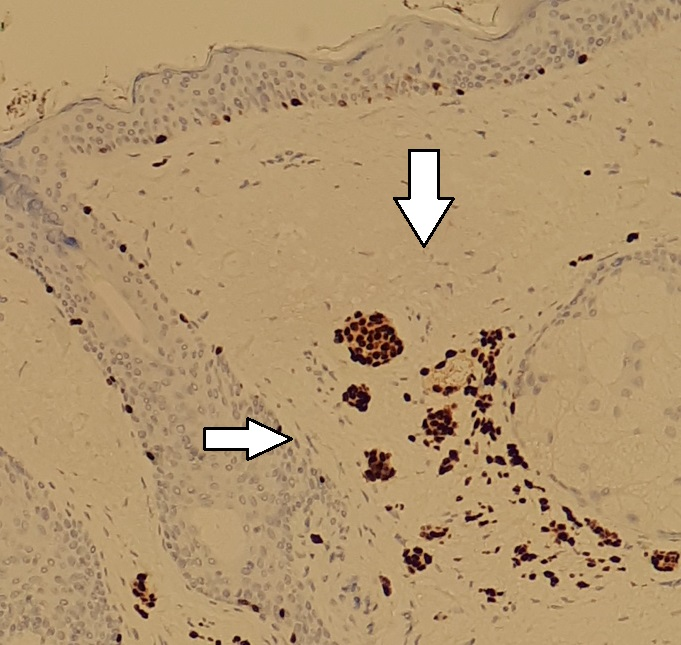
SOX10 immunohistochemistry in a dermal nevus, showing positively staining nevus cells (arrows)

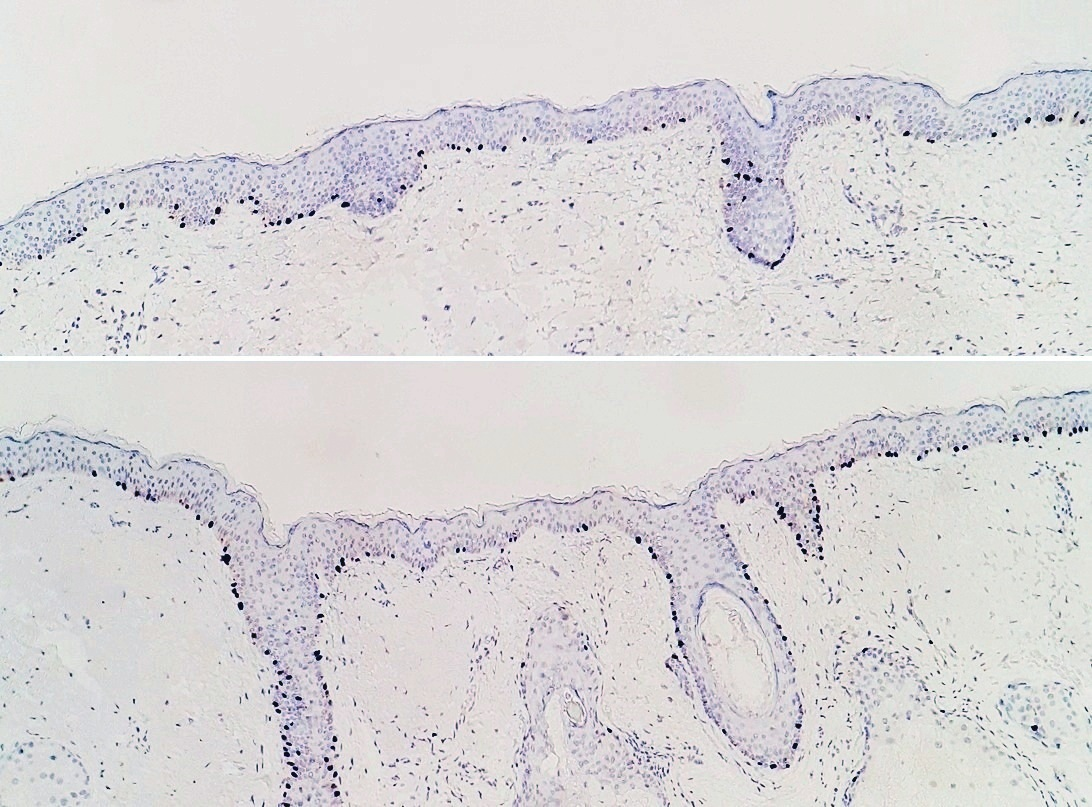
SOX10 immunohistochemistry of normal skin (top) and atypical melanocytic proliferation (bottom), seen mainly in hair follicles.

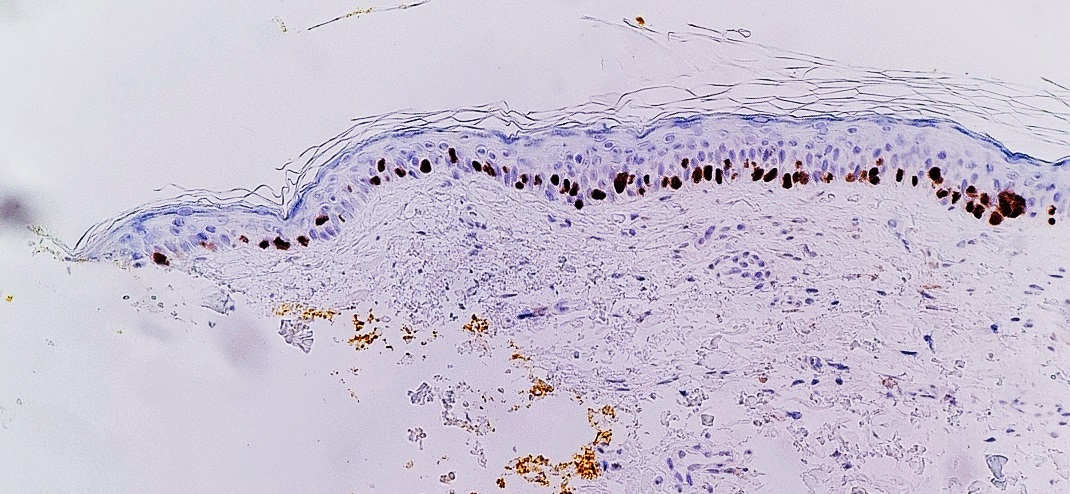
SOX10 immunohistochemistry facilitates showing lentigo maligna, as an increased number of melanocytes along stratum basale and nuclear pleomorphism. The changes are continuous with the resection margin (inked in yellow, at left), conferring a diagnosis of a not radically removed lentigo maligna.

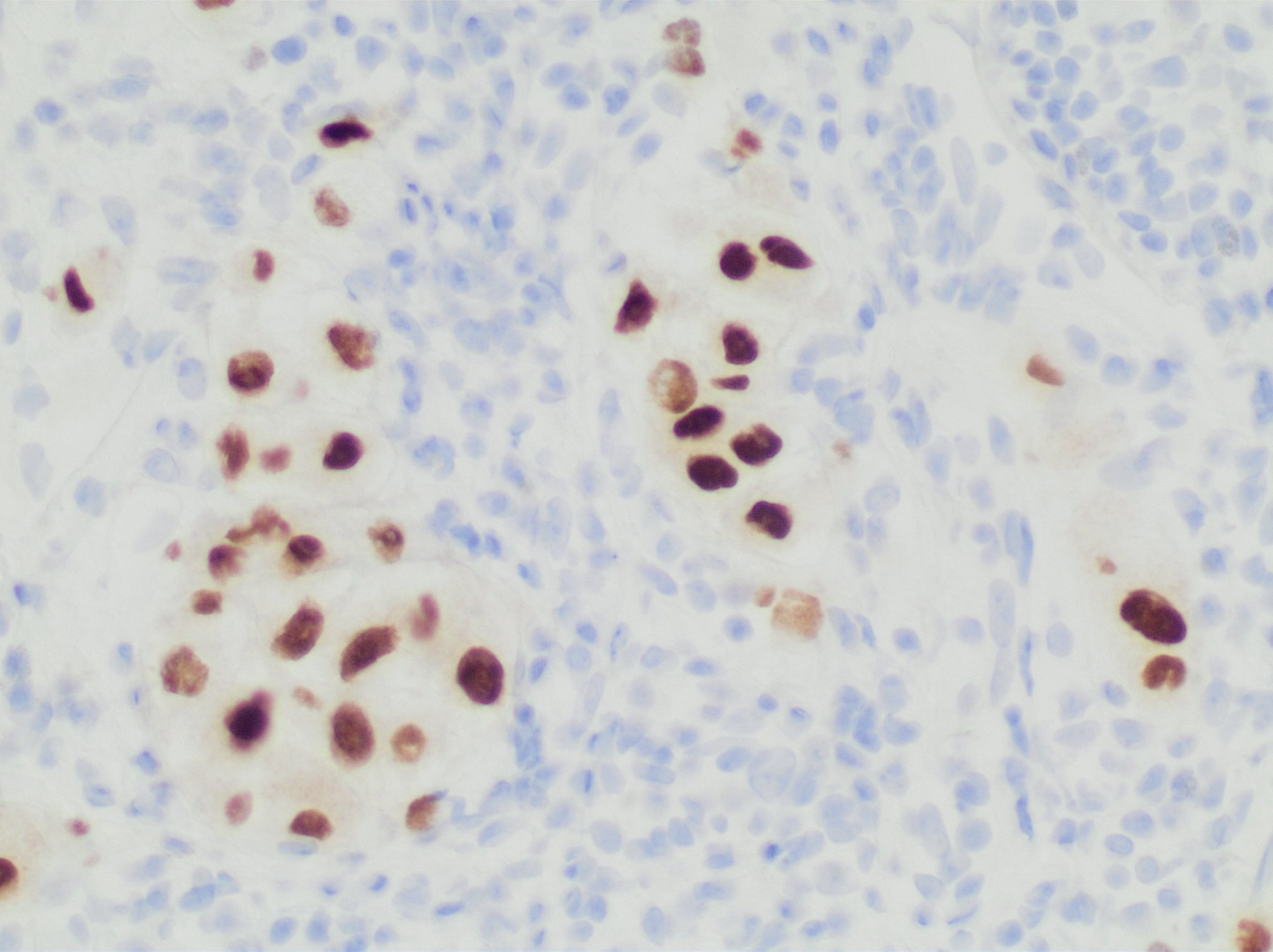
Immunohistochemistry stain for SOX10 in a poorly differentiated metastatic melanoma to a lymph node, helping in its diagnosis.

== Interactions ==
The interaction between SOX10 and PAX3 is studied best in human patients with Waardenburg syndrome, an autosomal dominant disorder that is divided into four different types based upon mutations in additional genes. SOX10 and PAX3 interactions are thought to be regulators of other genes involved in the symptoms of Waardenburg syndrome, particularly MITF, which influences the development of melanocytes as well as neural crest formation. MITF expression can be transactivated by both SOX10 and PAX3 to have an additive effect. The two genes have binding sites near one another on the upstream enhancer of the c-RET gene. SOX10 is also thought to target dopachrome tautomerase through a synergistic interaction with MITF, which then results in other melanocyte alteration.

SOX10 can influence the generation of Myelin Protein Zero (MPZ) transcription through its interactions with proteins such as OLIG1 and EGR2, which is important for the functionality of neurons. Other cofactors have been identified, such as SP1, OCT6, NMI, FOXD3 and SOX2.

The interaction between SOX10 and NMI seems to be coexpressed in glial cells, gliomas, and the spinal cord and has been shown to modulate the transcriptional activity of SOX10.

== See also ==
- SOX genes
- List of histologic stains that aid in diagnosis of cutaneous conditions
