= Petrus Johannes Waardenburg =

Dutch ophthalmologist and geneticist (1886–1979)

- Born: 3 June 1886; Nijeveen, Drenthe, Netherlands
- Died: 23 September 1979 (aged 93)
- Education: Utrecht University
- Occupations: Ophthalmologist; geneticist
- Known for: Waardenburg syndrome

Petrus Johannes Waardenburg (3 June 1886 – 23 September 1979) was a Dutch ophthalmologist, geneticist, and pioneer in the application of genetics to ophthalmology. Waardenburg syndrome is named after him.

== Biography ==
Waardenburg studied medicine at the Utrecht University from 1904–11, and then trained in ophthalmology before receiving an MD for a dissertation on the hereditary basis of the physiological and pathological characteristics of the eye in 1913.

Waardenburg was a regular contributor to eugenics publications. In 1932 Waardenburg suggested that Down syndrome might be the consequence of a chromosomal aberration, a fact which was confirmed after 27 years, by Jérôme Lejeune and his colleagues.

From 1934 to 1940, Waardenburg was external university lecturer in medical genetics at Utrecht University. From 1931 to 1935 he was secretary of the Netherlands Ophthalmological Society. He was a founding member of the Netherlands Anthropogenetic Society and its president from 1949 to 1963. He became honorary member of these two societies. He also became honorary member of similar Danish, Italian, and German societies. He was made honorary doctor of the Rijksuniversiteit in Leiden in 1954 and of the Wilhelms Universitat of Munster in 1964. Waardenburg spoke out against the use of eugenics to justify racial genocide by Nazis during their occupation of Netherlands from 1940-1945. They allowed him to continue his research because it did often support Nazi ideology.

Waardenburg was almost 50 years of age before he was habilitated as a lecturer in human genetics. At the age of 66, in 1952, he was finally appointed professor of genetics at the Institute of Preventive Medicine, Leiden. Between 1961 and 1974 the three volumes of his book Genetics and Ophthalmology were published. Until 1970 Waardenburg gave genetic advice in paternity cases in the Dutch legal courts and genetic counselling.

Between 1910 and 1970 Waardenburg published 267 papers in all. They included original observations on albinism' and many other hereditary conditions. He contributed the chapter on heredity in eye disease to Modern Trends in Ophthalmology.

== Waardenburg syndrome ==
Waardenburg syndrome is a rare genetic disorder most often characterized by varying degrees of deafness, minor defects in structures arising from the neural crest, and pigmentation anomalies.

In 1913, Jan van der Hoeve observed and described a lateral position of the lacrimal points and shortened eyelid slit in identical deaf mute twins. In August 1947 David Klein presented a deaf mute child, who was 10 years of age, and had partial albinism of the hair and body, blue hypoplastic rides, blepharophimosis, and malformation of the arms, to the Swiss Society of Genetics, and gave a full report of his findings in 1950. Waardenburg gave an account of a deaf adult with similar facial features in December 1948, followed by a detailed review in 1951. He described the syndrome as a distinct entity and found the anomalies in 12 of 840 deaf mutes.

== Honors ==
Waardenburg was awarded the Royal decoration Order of the Netherlands Lion in 1957. He received the Snellen medal in 1959. He founded the Waardenburg prize for special merit in the medical genetic field in 1965.
