= Jan van der Hoeve =

Dutch ophthalmologist (1878–1952)

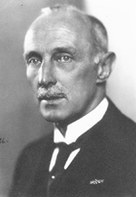
Jan van der Hoeve, circa 1940

Jan van der Hoeve (13 April 1878 in Santpoort – 26 April 1952 in Leiden) was a Dutch ophthalmologist. He is recognised for his concept of the phakomatoses, often called neurocutaneous syndromes.

Van der Hoeve graduated from the University of Leiden and received his doctorate at the University of Bern. He became a professor of ophthalmology at the University of Groningen and later at the University of Leiden. Van der Hoeve became a member of the Royal Netherlands Academy of Arts and Sciences in 1923. He was elected president of the Physical Section of the institute in 1932.

Van der Hoeve made one of the earliest descriptions of Waardenburg syndrome, in 1916.

== Papers ==
- Van der Hoeve J (1920). "Eye symptoms in tuberous sclerosis of the brain". Trans Ophthalmol Soc UK. 40: 329–334.

== See also ==
- Timeline of tuberous sclerosis
