= Pax genes =

Family of transcription factors

Paired domain
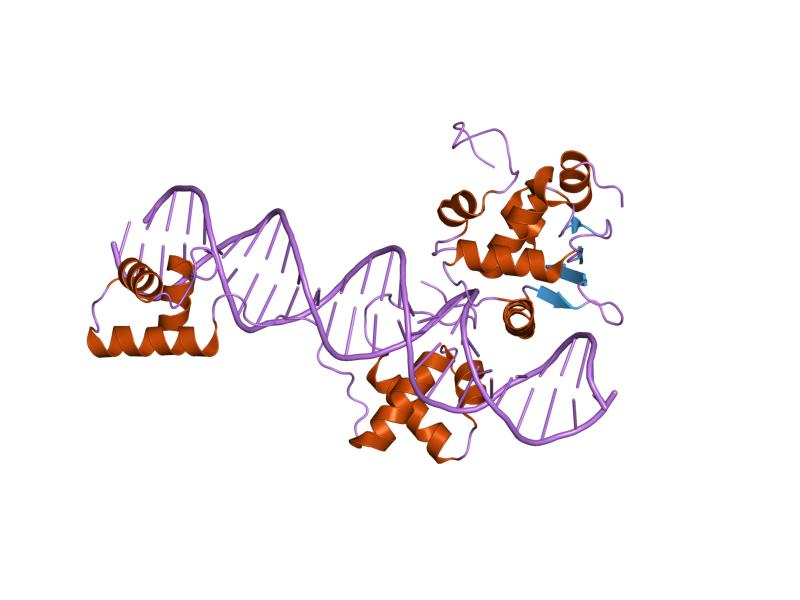
- PAX5 bound to DNA (PDB: 1mdm).

Identifiers
- Symbol: PAX
- Pfam: PF00292
- InterPro: IPR001523
- PROSITE: PDOC00034
- CATH: 1pdn
- SCOP2: 1pdn / SCOPe / SUPFAM
- CDD: cd00131
Available protein structures:
- PDB: IPR001523 PF00292 (ECOD; PDBsum)
- AlphaFold: IPR001523; PF00292

In evolutionary developmental biology, Paired box (Pax) genes are a family of genes coding for tissue specific transcription factors containing an N-terminal paired domain and usually a partial, or in the case of four family members (PAX3, PAX4, PAX6 and PAX7), a complete homeodomain to the C-terminus. An octapeptide as well as a Pro-Ser-Thr-rich C terminus may also be present. Pax proteins are important in early animal development for the specification of specific tissues, as well as during epimorphic limb regeneration in animals capable of such.

The paired domain was initially described in 1987 as the "paired box" in the Drosophila protein paired (prd; P06601).

== Groups ==
Within the mammalian family, there are four well defined groups of Pax genes.

- Pax group 1 (Pax 1 and 9),
- Pax group 2 (Pax 2, 5 and 8),
- Pax group 3 (Pax 3 and 7) and
- Pax group 4 (Pax 4 and 6).

Two more families, Pox-neuro and Pax-α/β, exist in basal bilaterian species. Orthologous genes exist throughout the Metazoa, including extensive study of the ectopic expression in Drosophila using murine Pax6. The two rounds of whole-genome duplications in vertebrate evolution is responsible for the creation of as many as 4 paralogs for each Pax protein.

== Members ==
- PAX1 has been identified in mice with the development of vertebrate and embryo segmentation, and some evidence this is also true in humans. It transcribes a 440 amino acid protein from 4 exons and 1,323bps in humans. In the mouse Pax1 mutation has been linked to undulated mutant suffering from skeletal malformations.
- PAX2 has been identified with kidney and optic nerve development. It transcribes a 417 amino acid protein from 11 exons and 4,261 bps in humans. Mutation of PAX2 in humans has been associated with renal-coloboma syndrome as well as oligomeganephronia.
- PAX3 has been identified with ear, eye and facial development. It transcribes a 479 amino acid protein in humans. Mutations in it can cause Waardenburg syndrome. PAX3 is frequently expressed in melanomas and contributes to tumor cell survival.
- PAX4 has been identified with pancreatic islet beta cells. It transcribes a 350 amino acid protein from 9 exons and 2,010 bps in humans. Knockout mice lacking Pax4 expression fail to develop insulin-producing cells. Pax4 undergoes mutual reciprocal interaction with the transcription factor Arx to endow pancreatic endocrine cells with insulin and glucagon cells respectively
- PAX5 has been identified with neural and spermatogenesis development and b-cell differentiation. It transcribes a 391 amino acid protein from 10 exons and 3,644bps in humans.
- PAX6 (eyeless) is the most researched and appears throughout the literature as a "master control" gene for the development of eyes and sensory organs, certain neural and epidermal tissues as well as other homologous structures, usually derived from ectodermal tissues.
- PAX7 has been possibly associated with myogenesis. It transcribes a protein of 520 amino acids from 8 exons and 2,260bps in humans. PAX7 directs postnatal renewal and propagation of myogenic satellite cells but not for the specification.
- PAX8 has been associated with thyroid specific expression. It transcribes a protein of 451 amino acids from 11 exons and 2,526bps in humans. Pax8 loss-of-function mutant mice lack follicular cells of the thyroid gland.
- PAX9 has found to be associated with a number of organ and other skeletal developments, particularly teeth. It transcribes a protein of 341 amino acids from 4 exons and 1,644bps in humans.

== See also ==
- Homeobox
- Evolutionary developmental biology
- Body plan
- SOX genes
