= SNAI2 =

Protein

Identifiers
- Aliases: SNAI2, SLUG, SLUGH1, SNAIL2, WS2D, snail family transcriptional repressor 2, SLUGH
- External IDs: OMIM: 602150; MGI: 1096393; GeneCards: SNAI2

Gene location (Human)
Chr.	Chromosome 8 (human)
Band	8q11.21	Start	48,917,598 bp
Band	8q11.21	End	48,921,740 bp

Gene location (Mouse)
Chr.	Chromosome 16 (mouse)
Band	16 A1|16 10.07 cM	Start	14,523,716 bp
Band	16 A1|16 10.07 cM	End	14,527,249 bp
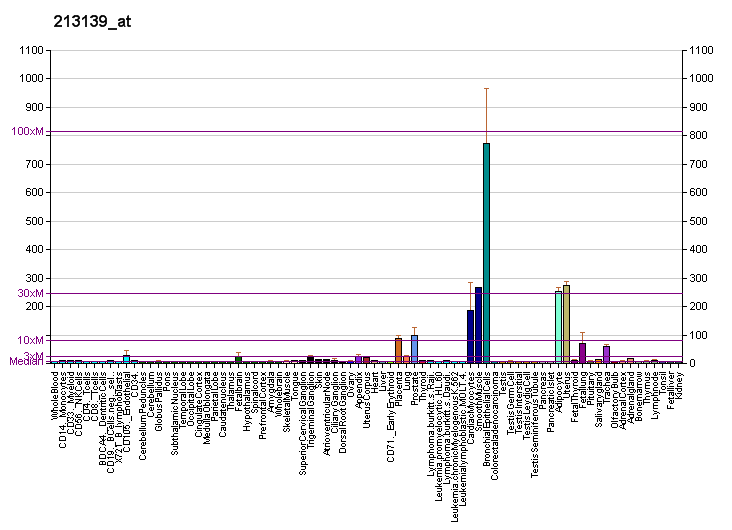
RNA expression pattern
Bgee	Human / Mouse (ortholog); Top expressed in: tibia; cartilage tissue; stromal cell of endometrium; skin of thigh; skin of arm; skin of hip; periodontal fiber; mucosa of paranasal sinus; tail of epididymis; seminal vesicula / Top expressed in: condyle; fossa; migratory enteric neural crest cell; conjunctival fornix; endothelial cell of lymphatic vessel; hair follicle; vas deferens; calvaria; maxillary prominence; body of femur; More reference expression data
BioGPS	More reference expression data
Gene ontology
Molecular function	sequence-specific DNA binding; DNA binding; metal ion binding; protein binding; nucleic acid binding; DNA-binding transcription factor activity, RNA polymerase II-specific; DNA-binding transcription repressor activity, RNA polymerase II-specific; RNA polymerase II transcription regulatory region sequence-specific DNA binding; chromatin binding; DNA-binding transcription factor activity; transcription factor activity, RNA polymerase II distal enhancer sequence-specific binding; E-box binding
Cellular component	cytoplasm; nucleus; nucleoplasm
Biological process	Notch signaling pathway; negative regulation of vitamin D receptor signaling pathway; regulation of transcription, DNA-templated; neural crest cell development; negative regulation of keratinocyte proliferation; regulation of bicellular tight junction assembly; positive regulation of cell migration; negative regulation of intrinsic apoptotic signaling pathway in response to DNA damage; transcription, DNA-templated; cellular response to epidermal growth factor stimulus; negative regulation of vitamin D biosynthetic process; regulation of chemokine production; multicellular organism development; negative regulation of chondrocyte differentiation; negative regulation of DNA damage response, signal transduction by p53 class mediator; regulation of osteoblast differentiation; osteoblast differentiation; canonical Wnt signaling pathway; negative regulation of canonical Wnt signaling pathway; negative regulation of cell adhesion mediated by integrin; negative regulation of anoikis; negative regulation of transcription by RNA polymerase II; epithelial to mesenchymal transition; epithelial to mesenchymal transition involved in endocardial cushion formation; cell migration involved in endocardial cushion formation; hearing; desmosome disassembly; pigmentation; epithelium development; negative regulation of extrinsic apoptotic signaling pathway in absence of ligand; aortic valve morphogenesis; negative regulation of cell adhesion involved in substrate-bound cell migration; response to radiation; cell migration; positive regulation of histone acetylation; negative regulation of apoptotic process; positive regulation of fat cell differentiation; white fat cell differentiation; roof of mouth development; cartilage morphogenesis; regulation of branching involved in salivary gland morphogenesis; cellular response to ionizing radiation; negative regulation of stem cell proliferation; Notch signaling involved in heart development
Sources:Amigo / QuickGO
Orthologs
Databases	NCBI: entry; OMA: entry
Species	Human	Mouse
Entrez	6591	20583
Ensembl	ENSG00000019549	ENSMUSG00000022676
UniProt	O43623	P97469
RefSeq (mRNA)	NM_003068	NM_011415
RefSeq (protein)	NP_003059	NP_035545
Location (UCSC)	Chr 8: 48.92 – 48.92 Mb	Chr 16: 14.52 – 14.53 Mb
PubMed search
- Wikidata
View/Edit Human	View/Edit Mouse

Zinc finger protein SNAI2 (also called SLUG) is a transcription factor that in humans is encoded by the SNAI2 gene. It promotes epithelial to mesenchymal transition, differentiation (e.g. in gastrulation), and migration of cells.

== Function ==
This gene encodes a member of the Snail superfamily of Cys_{2}His_{2}-type zinc finger transcription factors. The encoded protein acts as a transcriptional repressor that binds to E-box motifs and is also likely to repress E-cadherin transcription in breast carcinoma. This protein is involved in epithelial-mesenchymal transitions and has antiapoptotic activity. It regulates differentiation and migration of neural crest cells along with other genes (e.g. FOXD3, SOX9 and SOX10, BMPs) in embryonic life. Mutations in this gene may be associated with sporadic cases of neural tube defects.

SNAI2 downregulates expression of E-cadherin in premigratory neural crest cells; thus, SNAI2 induces tightly bound epithelial cells to break into a loose mesenchymal phenotype, allowing gastrulation of mesoderm in the developing embryo. Structurally similar to anti-apoptotic Ces-1 in C. elegans, SLUG is a negative regulator of productive cell death in the developing embryo and adults.

== Clinical significance ==
Widely expressed in human tissues, SLUG is most notably absent in peripheral blood leukocytes, adult liver, and both fetal and adult brain tissues. SLUG plays a role in breast carcinoma as well as leukemia by downregulation of E-cadherin, which supports mesenchymal phenotype by shifting expression from a Type I to Type II cadherin profile. Maintenance of mesenchymal phenotype enables metastasis of tumor cells, though SLUG is expressed in carcinomas regardless to invasiveness. A knockout model using chick embryos has also showed inhibition of mesodermal and neural crest delamination; chick embryo Slug gain of function appears to increase neural crest production. Mutations in Slug are associated with loss of pregnancy during gastrulation in some animals.

== Interactions ==
Bone morphogenetic proteins (BMPs) precede expression of SLUG and are suspected as the immediate upstream inducers of gene expression.

== Snail2 and PRC2 in Neural Crest Development ==
During early vertebrate development, SLUG partners with the Polycomb repressive complex 2 (PRC2) to regulate the formation and migration of neural crest cells, a group of cells that contribute to facial structures, nerves, and pigment cells. PRC2, made up of EZH2, EED, and SUZ12, modifies chromatin to silence genes by adding repressive histone marks (H3K27me3). These components are actively expressed in neural and neural crest tissues and are essential for normal development in these regions.

Experiments showed that loss of EZH2 leads to reduced expression of important neural crest genes such as Snail2, Sox9, and Sox10, impaired cell migration, and craniofacial defects. The researchers also found that Snail2 physically interacts with EZH2, helping to guide PRC2 to specific target genes.

One key target is E-cadherin, a gene that must be repressed for neural crest cells to undergo epithelial-to-mesenchymal transition (EMT) and migrate. Snail2 and EZH2 were shown to co-bind the E-cadherin promoter, and without EZH2, Snail2 could not silence the gene effectively. This results in failed EMT and reduced cell movement.

Together, these findings show that Snail2 relies on PRC2 not just to repress target genes, but to carry out the complex choreography of neural crest development.
