= PAX3 =

Paired box gene 3

Identifiers
- Aliases: PAX3, CDHS, HUP2, WS1, WS3, Pax3, paired box 3, PAX-3
- External IDs: OMIM: 606597; MGI: 97487; GeneCards: PAX3
Available structures
PDB	Ortholog search: PDBe RCSB
PDB	List of PDB id codes 3CMY

Gene location (Human)
Chr.	Chromosome 2 (human)
Band	2q36.1	Start	222,199,887 bp
Band	2q36.1	End	222,298,998 bp

Gene location (Mouse)
Chr.	Chromosome 1 (mouse)
Band	1 C4|1 39.79 cM	Start	78,077,904 bp
Band	1 C4|1 39.79 cM	End	78,173,771 bp
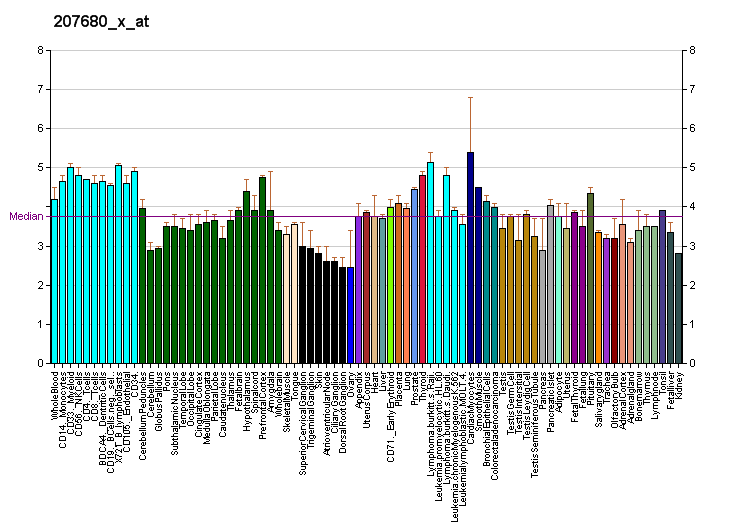

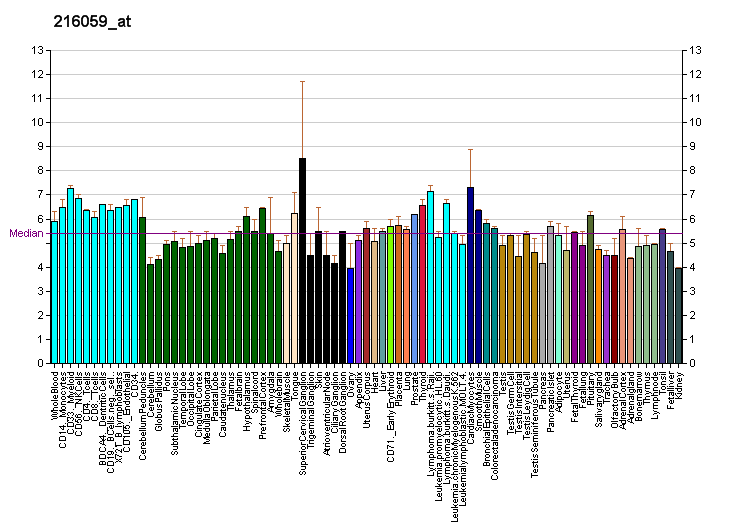
RNA expression pattern
Bgee	Human / Mouse (ortholog); Top expressed in: olfactory zone of nasal mucosa; testicle; muscle of thigh; minor salivary glands; skin of thigh; Achilles tendon; gastrocnemius muscle; deltoid muscle; skin of abdomen; right hemisphere of cerebellum / Top expressed in: pelvic ganglion; maxillary prominence; tail of embryo; pretectal area; female urethra; pineal gland; neural groove; iris; neural fold; lower lip; More reference expression data
BioGPS	More reference expression data
Gene ontology
Molecular function	HMG box domain binding; DNA binding; protein binding; sequence-specific DNA binding; DNA-binding transcription factor activity; DNA-binding transcription factor activity, RNA polymerase II-specific
Cellular component	nucleus; nucleoplasm
Biological process	animal organ morphogenesis; positive regulation of transcription, DNA-templated; multicellular organism development; muscle organ development; regulation of transcription, DNA-templated; transcription by RNA polymerase II; hearing; transcription, DNA-templated; nervous system development; positive regulation of transcription by RNA polymerase II; apoptotic process
Sources:Amigo / QuickGO
Orthologs
Databases	NCBI: entry; OMA: entry
Species	Human	Mouse
Entrez	5077	18505
Ensembl	ENSG00000135903	ENSMUSG00000004872
UniProt	P23760	P24610
RefSeq (mRNA)	NM_000438; NM_001127366; NM_013942; NM_181457; NM_181458 NM_181459; NM_181460; NM_181461	NM_001159520; NM_008781
RefSeq (protein)	NP_000429; NP_001120838; NP_039230; NP_852122; NP_852123 NP_852124; NP_852125; NP_852126; NP_852122.1	NP_001152992; NP_032807
Location (UCSC)	Chr 2: 222.2 – 222.3 Mb	Chr 1: 78.08 – 78.17 Mb
PubMed search
- Wikidata
View/Edit Human	View/Edit Mouse

The PAX3 (paired box gene 3) gene encodes a member of the paired box or PAX family of transcription factors. The PAX family consists of nine human (PAX1-PAX9) and nine mouse (Pax1-Pax9) members arranged into four subfamilies. Human PAX3 and mouse Pax3 are present in a subfamily along with the highly homologous human PAX7 and mouse Pax7 genes. The human PAX3 gene is located in the 2q36.1 chromosomal region, and contains 10 exons within a 100 kb region.

== Transcript splicing ==
Alternative splicing and processing generates multiple PAX3 isoforms that have been detected at the mRNA level. PAX3e is the longest isoform and consists of 10 exons that encode a 505 amino acid protein. In other mammalian species, including mouse, the longest mRNAs correspond to the human PAX3c and PAX3d isoforms, which consist of the first 8 or 9 exons of the PAX3 gene, respectively. Shorter PAX3 isoforms include mRNAs that skip exon 8 (PAX3g and PAX3h) and mRNAs containing 4 or 5 exons (PAX3a and PAX3b). In limited studies comparing isoform expression, PAX3d is expressed at the highest levels. From a functional standpoint, PAX3c, PAX3d, and PAX3h stimulate activities such as cell growth whereas PAX3e and PAX3g inhibit these activities, and PAX3a and PAX3b show no activity or inhibit these endpoints.

A common alternative splice affecting the PAX3 mRNA involves the sequence CAG at the 5’ end of exon 3. This splice either includes or excludes these three bases, thus resulting in the presence or absence of a glutamine residue in the paired box motif. Limited sequencing studies of full-length human cDNAs identified this splicing event as a variant of the PAX3d isoform, and this spliced isoform has been separately termed the PAX3i isoform. The Q+ and Q− isoforms of PAX3 are generally co-expressed in cells. At the functional level, the Q+ isoform shows similar or less DNA binding and transcriptional activation than the Q− isoform.

== Protein structure and function ==
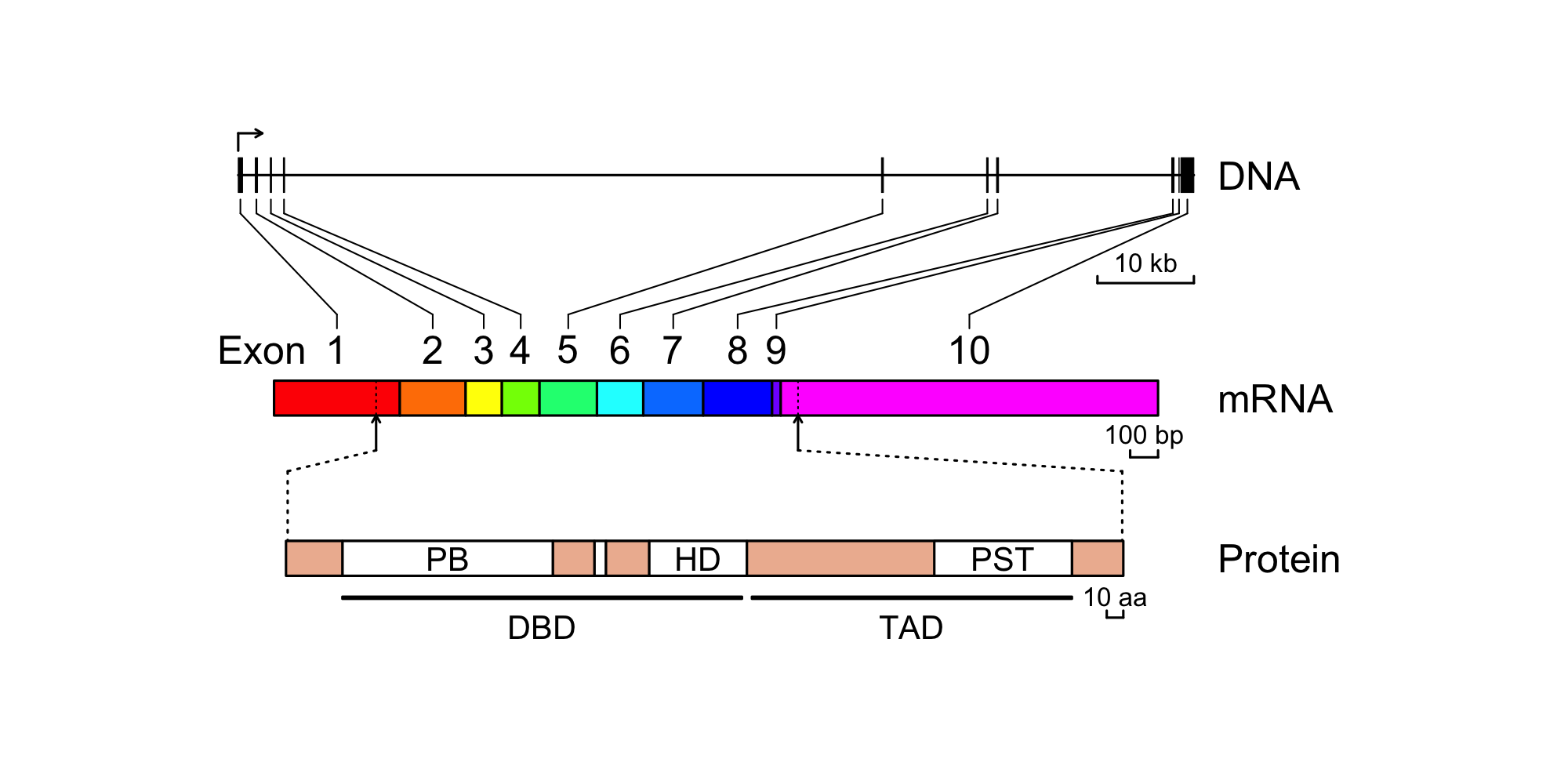
Structure of the PAX3 gene, mRNA and protein. The exons in the DNA and mRNA diagrams are numbered, and a horizontal arrow in the DNA diagram shows the promoter and direction of transcription. The start and stop codons are shown in the mRNA diagram by the vertical arrows. Conserved regions are indicated by open boxes in the protein diagram, and functional domains are indicated as thick horizontal lines above the protein diagram. Representative sizes are shown by the thin horizontal line segments in the DNA, mRNA and protein diagrams. Abbreviations: PB, paired box domain; HD, homeodomain; PST, proline-, serine- and threonine-rich region; DBD, DNA binding domain; TAD, transcription activation domain.

PAX3 encodes a transcription factor with an N-terminal DNA binding domain consisting of a paired box (PD) encoded by exons 2, 3, and 4, and an octapeptide and complete homeodomain (HD) encoded by exons 5 and 6. In addition, the PAX3 protein has a C-terminal transcriptional activation domain encoded by exons 7 and 8. The highly conserved PD consists of a 128 amino acid region that binds to DNA sequences related to the TCACGC/G motif. The HD motif usually consists of 60 amino acids and binds to sequences containing a TAAT core motif. The combination of these two DNA binding domains enable the PAX3 protein to recognize longer sequences containing PD and HD binding sites. In the C-terminus of PAX3, there is a proline, serine and threonine (PST)-rich region measuring 78 amino acids that functions to stimulate transcriptional activity. There are also transcriptional repression domains in the HD and N-terminal region (including the first half of the PD) that repress the C-terminal transcriptional activation domain.

PAX3 functions as a transcriptional activator for most target genes, but also may repress a smaller subset of target genes. These expression changes are effected through binding of PAX3 to specific recognition sites, which are situated in various genomic locations. Some binding sites are located in or near target genes, such as the 5’ promoter, first intron and 3’ untranslated region. A substantial number of PAX3 binding sites are located at larger distances upstream and downstream of target genes. Among the PAX3 target genes, there is one group associated with muscle development and a second group associated with neural and melanocyte development. The proteins encoded by these target genes regulate various functional activities in these lineages, including differentiation, proliferation, migration, adhesion, and apoptosis.

PAX3 interacts with other nuclear proteins, which modulate PAX3 transcriptional activity. Dimerization of PAX3 with another PAX3 molecule or a PAX7 molecule enables binding to a palindromic HD binding site (TAATCAATTA). Interaction of PAX3 with other transcription factors (such as SOX10) or chromatin factors (such as PAX3/7BP) enables synergistic activation of PAX3 target genes. In contrast, binding of PAX3 to co-repressors, such as calmyrin, inhibits activation of PAX3 target genes. These co-repressors may function by altering chromatin structure at target genes, inhibiting PAX3 recognition of its DNA binding site or directly altering PAX3 transcriptional activity.

Finally, PAX3 protein expression and function can be modulated by post-translational modifications. PAX3 can be phosphorylated at serines 201, 205 and 209 by kinases such as GSK3b, which in some settings will increase PAX3 protein stability. In addition, PAX3 can also undergo ubiquitination and acetylation at lysines 437 and 475, which regulates protein stability and function.

Table 1. Representative PAX3 transcriptional target genes.

Protein category	Name	Phenotypic Activity
Cell adhesion molecule	NRCAM	Intercellular adhesion
Chemokine receptor	CXCR4	Motility
Receptor tyrosine kinase	FGFR4	Proliferation, differentiation, migration
	MET	Proliferation, migration, survival
	RET	Proliferation, migration, differentiation
Transcription factor	MITF	Differentiation, proliferation, survival
	MYF5	Differentiation
	MYOD1	Differentiation

== Expression during development ==
During development, one of the major lineages expressing Pax3 is the skeletal muscle lineage. Pax3 expression is first seen in the pre-somitic paraxial mesoderm, and then ultimately becomes restricted to the dermomyotome, which forms from the dorsal region of the somites. To form skeletal muscle in central body segments, PAX3-expressing cells detach from the dermomyotome and then Pax3 expression is turned off as Myf5 and MyoD1 expression is activated. To form other skeletal muscles, Pax3-expressing cells detach from the dermomyotome and migrate to more distant sites, such as the limbs and diaphragm. A subset of these Pax3-expressing dermomyotome-derived cells also serves as an ongoing progenitor pool for skeletal muscle growth during fetal development. During later developmental stages, myogenic precursors expressing Pax3 and/or Pax7 form satellite cells within the skeletal muscle, which contribute to postnatal muscle growth and muscle regeneration. These adult satellite cells remain quiescent until injury occurs, and then are stimulated to divide and regenerate the injured muscle.

Pax3 is also involved in the development of the nervous system. Expression of Pax3 is first detected in the dorsal region of the neural groove and, as this neural groove deepens to form the neural tube, Pax3 is expressed in the dorsal portion of the neural tube. As the neural tube enlarges, Pax3 expression is localized to proliferative cells in the inner ventricular zone and then this expression is turned off as these cells migrate to more superficial regions. Pax3 is expressed along the length of the neural tube and throughout much of the developing brain, and this expression is subsequently turned off during later developmental stages in a rostral to caudal direction.

During early development, Pax3 expression also occurs at the lateral and posterior margins of the neural plate, which is the region from which the neural crest arises. Pax3 is later expressed by various cell types and structures arising from the neural crest, such as melanoblasts, Schwann cell precursors, and dorsal root ganglia. In addition, Pax3-expressing cells derived from the neural crest contribute to the formation of other structures, such as the inner ear, mandible and maxilla.

Pax3 controls the location of the nasion (a facial feature between the eyes and at the top of the nose), and is associated with the presence of a unibrow.

== Germline mutations in disease ==
Germline mutations of the Pax3 gene cause the splotch phenotype in mice. At the molecular level, this phenotype is caused by point mutations or deletions that alter or abolish Pax3 transcriptional function. In the heterozygous state, the splotch phenotype is characterized by white patches in the belly, tail and feet. These white spots are attributed to localized deficiencies in pigment-forming melanocytes resulting from neural crest cell defects. In the homozygous state, these Pax3 mutations cause embryonic lethality, which is associated with prominent neural tube closure defects and abnormalities of neural crest-derived structures, such as melanocytes, dorsal root ganglia and enteric ganglia. Heart malformations also result from the loss of cardiac neural crest cells, which normally contribute to the cardiac outflow tract and innervation of the heart. Finally, limb musculature does not develop in the homozygotes and axial musculature demonstrates varying abnormalities. These myogenic effects are caused by increased cell death of myogenic precursors in the dermomyotome and diminished migration from the dermomyotome.

Germline mutations of the PAX3 gene occur in the human disease Waardenburg syndrome, which consists of four autosomal dominant genetic disorders (WS1, WS2, WS3 and WS4). Of the four subtypes, WS1 and WS3 are usually caused by PAX3 mutations. All four subtypes are characterized by hearing loss, eye abnormalities and pigmentation disorders. In addition, WS1 is frequently associated with a midfacial alteration called dystopia canthorum, while WS3 (Klein-Waardenburg syndrome) is frequently distinguished by musculoskeletal abnormalities affecting the upper limbs. Most WS1 cases are caused by heterozygous PAX3 mutations while WS3 is caused by either partial or total deletion of PAX3 and contiguous genes or by smaller PAX3 mutations in the heterozygous or homozygous state. These PAX3 mutations in WS1 and WS3 include missense, nonsense and splicing mutations; small insertions; and small or gross deletions. Though these changes are usually not recurrent, the mutations generally occur in exons 2 through 6 with exon 2 mutations being most common. As these exons encode the paired box and homeodomain, these mutations often affect DNA binding function.

== Mutations in human cancer ==
Alveolar rhabdomyosarcoma (ARMS) is an aggressive soft tissue sarcoma that occurs in children and is usually characterized by a recurrent t(2;13)(q35;q14) chromosomal translocation. This 2;13 translocation breaks and rejoins portions of the PAX3 and FOXO1 genes to generate a PAX3-FOXO1 fusion gene that expresses a PAX3-FOXO1 fusion transcript encoding a PAX3-FOXO1 fusion protein. PAX3 and FOXO1 encode transcription factors, and the translocation results in a fusion transcription factor containing the N-terminal PAX3 DNA-binding domain and the C-terminal FOXO1 transactivation domain. A smaller subset of ARMS cases is associated with less common fusions of PAX7 to FOXO1 or rare fusions of PAX3 to other transcription factors, such as NCOA1. Compared to the wild-type PAX3 protein, the PAX3-FOXO1 fusion protein more potently activates PAX3 target genes. In ARMS cells, PAX3-FOXO1 usually functions as a transcriptional activator and excessively increases expression of downstream target genes. In addition, PAX3-FOXO1 binds along with MYOD1, MYOG and MYCN as well as chromatin structural proteins, such as CHD4 and BRD4, to contribute to the formation of super enhancers in the vicinity of a subset of these target genes. These dysregulated target genes contribute to tumorigenesis by altering signaling pathways that affect proliferation, cell death, myogenic differentiation, and migration.

A t(2;4)(q35;q31.1) chromosomal translocation that fuses the PAX3 and MAML3 genes occurs in biphenotypic sinonasal sarcoma (BSNS), a low-grade adult malignancy associated with both myogenic and neural differentiation. MAML3 encodes a transcriptional coactivator involved in Notch signaling. The PAX3-MAML3 fusion juxtaposes the N-terminal PAX3 DNA binding domain with the C-terminal MAML3 transactivation domain to create another potent activator of target genes with PAX3 binding sites. Of note, PAX3 is rearranged without MAML3 involvement in a smaller subset of BSNS cases, and some of these variant cases contain a PAX3-NCOA1 or PAX3-FOXO1 fusion. Though PAX3-FOXO1 and PAX3-NCOA1 fusions can be formed in both ARMS and BSNS, there are differences in the pattern of activated downstream target genes suggesting that the cell environment has an important role in modulating the output of these fusion transcription factors.

In addition to tumors with PAX3-related fusion genes, there are several other tumor categories that express the wild-type PAX3 gene. The presence of PAX3 expression in some tumors can be explained by their derivation from developmental lineages normally expressing wild-type PAX3. For example, PAX3 is expressed in cancers associated with neural tube-derived lineages, (e.g., glioblastoma), neural crest-derived lineages (e.g., melanoma) and myogenic lineages (e.g., embryonal rhabdomyosarcoma). However, PAX3 is also expressed in other cancer types without a clear relationship to a PAX3-expressing developmental lineages, such as breast carcinoma and osteosarcoma. In these wild-type PAX3-expressing cancers, PAX3 function impacts on the control of proliferation, apoptosis, differentiation and motility. Therefore, wild-type PAX3 exerts a regulatory role in tumorigenesis and tumor progression, which may be related to its role in normal development.
