= FOXD3 =

Protein found in humans

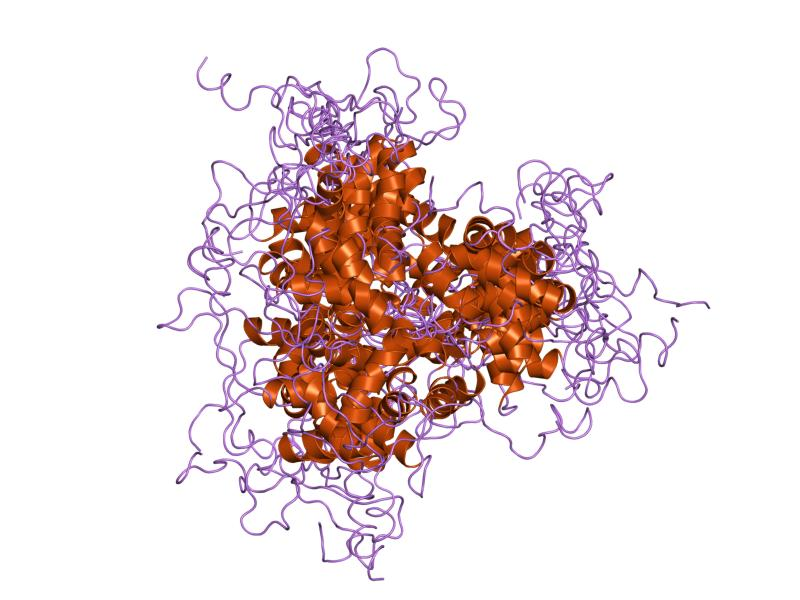

Identifiers
- Aliases: FOXD3, AIS1, Genesis, HFH2, VAMAS2, forkhead box D3
- External IDs: OMIM: 611539; MGI: 1347473; GeneCards: FOXD3

Gene location (Human)
Chr.	Chromosome 1 (human)
Band	1p31.3	Start	63,322,567 bp
Band	1p31.3	End	63,325,128 bp

Gene location (Mouse)
Chr.	Chromosome 4 (mouse)
Band	4 C6|4 45.71 cM	Start	99,544,536 bp
Band	4 C6|4 45.71 cM	End	99,546,859 bp
RNA expression pattern
Bgee	Human / Mouse (ortholog); Top expressed in: sural nerve; spinal ganglia; trigeminal ganglion; muscle layer of sigmoid colon; gastric mucosa; right auricle of heart; seminal vesicula; left coronary artery; transverse colon; olfactory zone of nasal mucosa / Top expressed in: neural crest; epiblast; spinal cord; urethra; ureter; neural groove; neural fold; salivary gland; embryo; spinal ganglia; More reference expression data
BioGPS	n/a
Gene ontology
Molecular function	protein binding; DNA-binding transcription repressor activity, RNA polymerase II-specific; sequence-specific DNA binding; RNA polymerase II transcription regulatory region sequence-specific DNA binding; DNA-binding transcription factor activity; DNA binding; DNA-binding transcription factor activity, RNA polymerase II-specific
Cellular component	nucleoplasm; nucleus
Biological process	negative regulation of transcription by RNA polymerase II; positive regulation of transcription by RNA polymerase II; regulation of transcription, DNA-templated; multicellular organism development; somatic stem cell population maintenance; in utero embryonic development; transcription, DNA-templated; anatomical structure morphogenesis; cell differentiation; regulation of transcription by RNA polymerase II
Sources:Amigo / QuickGO
Orthologs
Databases	NCBI: entry; OMA: entry
Species	Human	Mouse
Entrez	27022	15221
Ensembl	ENSG00000187140	ENSMUSG00000067261
UniProt	Q9UJU5	Q61060
RefSeq (mRNA)	NM_012183	NM_010425
RefSeq (protein)	NP_036315	NP_034555
Location (UCSC)	Chr 1: 63.32 – 63.33 Mb	Chr 4: 99.54 – 99.55 Mb
PubMed search
- Wikidata
View/Edit Human	View/Edit Mouse

Forkhead box D3 also known as FOXD3 is a forkhead protein that in humans is encoded by the FOXD3 gene.

== Function ==
This gene belongs to the forkhead protein family of transcription factors which is characterized by a DNA-binding forkhead domain. FoxD3 functions as a transcriptional repressor and contains the C-terminal engrailed homology-1 motif (eh1), which provides an interactive surface with a transcriptional co-repressor Grg4 (Groucho-related gene-4).

=== Stem Cells ===
Multiple studies have suggested Foxd3 involvement in the transition from naive to primed pluripotent stem cells in embryo development. Previously, Foxd3 was demonstrated to be required in maintaining pluripotency in mouse embryonic stem cells. A recent finding further showed that Foxd3 is necessary as a repressor in the transition from ESC to epiblast-like cells (EpiLC). The study proposed that Foxd3 is associated with inactivation of important naive pluripotency genes by its modification of chromatin structures via recruiting histone demethylases and decreasing the number of activating factors. Another proposed mechanism on the other hand argued that Foxd3 begins nucleosome removal and induction to a "primed" pluripotent state by recruiting Brg1, a nucleosome remodeler, and then acts as a repressor of maximal activation of those enhancers by recruiting histone deacetylases, suggesting a complex mediating function in which enhancers are primed for some future controlled time-point rather than immediate expression. While there is no ambiguity that Foxd3 plays an important role regulating the transition from naive to primed pluripotency state, the two models show a different process. Attempts to reconcile the conclusions of the two studies have further suggested that Foxd3 functions as all of the above.

=== Neural Crest Cells ===
FOXD3 plays an important role in the development and differentiation of neural crest cells. Specifically, it is thought that FOXD3 plays an important role in controlling the developmental switch between Schwann Cell Progenitors and Melanocytes.

== Clinical significance ==
Mutations in this gene cause vitiligo.
