= Telecanthus =

Increased distance between the inner corners of the eyelids

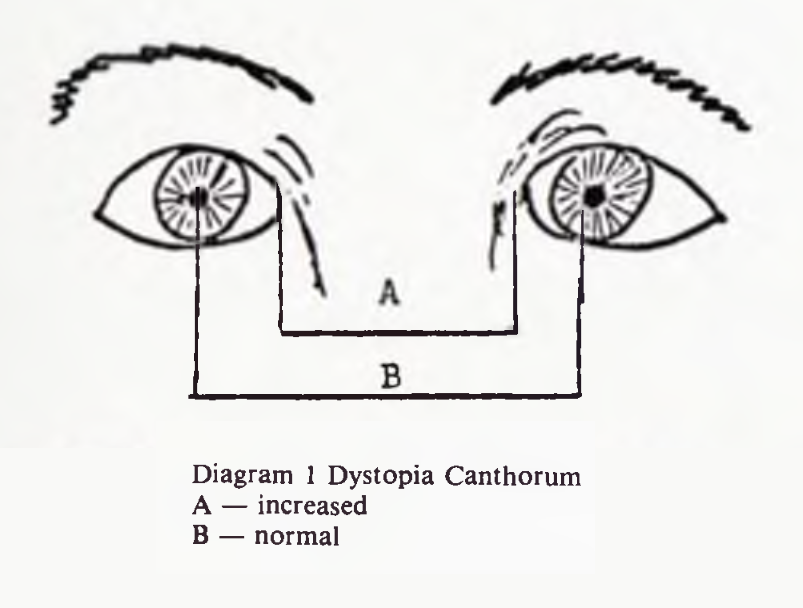
Diagram showing the definition of telecanthus, or dystopia canthorum

Telecanthus, or dystopia canthorum, refers to increased distance between the inner corners of the eyelids (medial canthi), while the inter-pupillary distance is normal. This is in contrast to hypertelorism, in which the distance between the whole eyes is increased. Telecanthus and hypertelorism are each associated with multiple congenital disorders.

The distance between the inner corners of the eyelids is called the intercanthal distance. In most people, the intercanthal distance is equal to the width of each eye (the distance between the inner and outer corners of each eye). The average interpupillary distance is 60–62 millimeters (mm), which corresponds to an intercanthal distance of approximately 30–31 mm.

Traumatic telecanthus refers to telecanthus resulting from traumatic injury to the nasal-orbital-ethmoid (NOE) complex. The diagnosis of traumatic telecanthus requires a measurement in excess of those normative values. The pathology can be either unilateral or bilateral, with the former more difficult to measure.

== Systemic associations ==
Telecanthus is often associated with many congenital disorders. Congenital disorders such as Down syndrome, fetal alcohol syndrome, cri du chat syndrome, Klinefelter syndrome, Turner syndrome, Ehlers–Danlos syndrome, Waardenburg syndrome often present with prominent epicanthal folds, and if these folds are nasal (as they most commonly are) they will cause telecanthus.

== Etymology ==
Telecanthus comes from the Greek word τῆλε (tele, "far") and the latinized form of the Greek word κάνθος, (kánthos, meaning 'corner of the eyelid'. Dystopia canthorum comes from the Greek δυσ- (dus-, "bad") and τόπος (tópos, "place") and the latinized Greek word κάνθος, adapted to latin morphology canthorum ("of the canthi").

== See also ==
- Blepharophimosis, reduced size of the eyelid openings, which can result in telecanthus
