= Muscle cell =

Type of cell found in muscle tissue

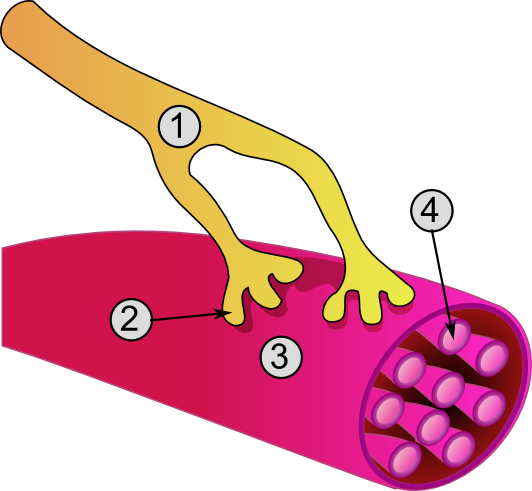
- General structure of a skeletal muscle cell and neuromuscular junction: 1. Axon; 2. Neuromuscular junction 3. Skeletal muscle fiber 4. Myofibril

Details
- Location: Muscle

Identifiers
- Latin: myocytus
- MeSH: D032342
- TH: H2.00.05.0.00002
- FMA: 67328

A muscle cell, also known as a myocyte, is a mature contractile cell in the muscle of an animal. In humans and other vertebrates there are three types: skeletal, smooth, and cardiac (cardiomyocytes). A skeletal muscle cell is long and threadlike with many nuclei and is called a muscle fiber. Muscle cells develop from embryonic precursor cells called myoblasts.

Skeletal muscle cells form by fusion of myoblasts to produce multinucleated cells (syncytia) in a process known as myogenesis. Skeletal muscle cells and cardiac muscle cells both contain myofibrils and sarcomeres and form a striated muscle tissue.

Cardiac muscle cells form the cardiac muscle in the walls of the heart chambers, and have a single central nucleus. Cardiac muscle cells are joined to neighboring cells by intercalated discs, and when joined in a visible unit they are described as a cardiac muscle fiber.

Smooth muscle cells control involuntary movements such as the peristalsis contractions in the esophagus and stomach. Smooth muscle has no myofibrils or sarcomeres and is therefore non-striated. Smooth muscle cells have a single nucleus.

== Structure ==
The unusual microscopic anatomy of a muscle cell gave rise to its terminology. The cytoplasm in a muscle cell is termed the sarcoplasm; the smooth endoplasmic reticulum of a muscle cell is termed the sarcoplasmic reticulum; and the cell membrane in a muscle cell is termed the sarcolemma. The sarcolemma receives and conducts stimuli.

=== Skeletal muscle cells ===
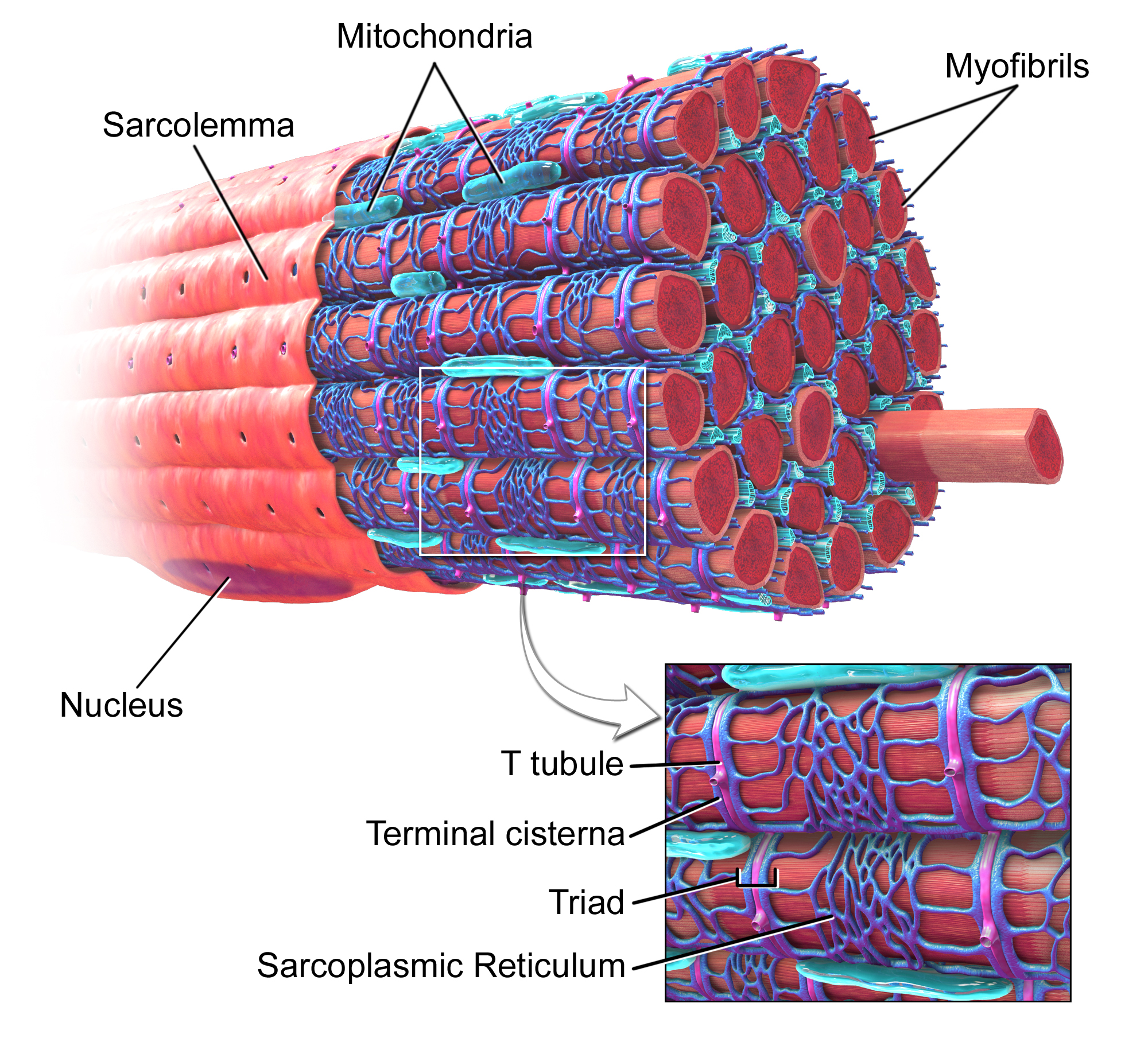
Diagram of skeletal muscle fiber structure

Skeletal muscle cells are the individual contractile cells within a muscle and are more usually known as muscle fibers because of their longer, threadlike appearance. Broadly there are two types of muscle fiber performing in muscle contraction, either as slow twitch (type I) or fast twitch (type II).

A single muscle, such as the biceps brachii in a young adult human male, contains around 253,000 muscle fibers. Skeletal muscle fibers are the only muscle cells that are multinucleated with the nuclei usually referred to as myonuclei. This occurs during myogenesis with the fusion of myoblasts, each contributing a nucleus to the newly formed muscle cell or myotube. Fusion depends on muscle-specific proteins known as fusogens called myomaker and myomerger.

A striated muscle fiber contains myofibrils consisting of long protein chains of myofilaments. There are three types of myofilaments: thin, thick, and elastic, that work together to produce a muscle contraction. The thin myofilaments are filaments of mostly actin and the thick filaments are of mostly myosin, and they slide over each other to shorten the fiber length in a muscle contraction. The third type of myofilament is an elastic filament composed of titin, a very large protein.

In striations of muscle bands, myosin forms the dark filaments that make up the A band. Thin filaments of actin are the light filaments that make up the I band. The smallest contractile unit in the fiber is called the sarcomere, which is a repeating unit within two Z bands. The sarcoplasm also contains glycogen which provides energy to the cell during heightened exercise, and myoglobin, the red pigment that stores oxygen until needed for muscular activity.

The sarcoplasmic reticulum, a specialized type of smooth endoplasmic reticulum, forms a network around each myofibril of the muscle fiber. This network is composed of groupings of two dilated end-sacs called terminal cisternae, and a single T-tubule (transverse tubule), which bores through the cell and emerge on the other side; together these three components form the triads that exist within the network of the sarcoplasmic reticulum, in which each T-tubule has two terminal cisternae on each side of it. The sarcoplasmic reticulum serves as a reservoir for calcium ions, so when an action potential spreads over the T-tubule, it signals the sarcoplasmic reticulum to release calcium ions from the gated membrane channels to stimulate muscle contraction.

In skeletal muscle, at the end of each muscle fiber, the outer layer of the sarcolemma combines with tendon fibers at the myotendinous junction. Within the muscle fiber pressed against the sarcolemma are multiply flattened nuclei; embryologically, this multinucleate condition results from multiple myoblasts fusing to produce each muscle fiber, where each myoblast contributes one nucleus.

=== Cardiac muscle cells ===
The cell membrane of a cardiac muscle cell has several specialized regions, which may include the intercalated disc, and transverse tubules. The cell membrane is covered by a lamina coat which is approximately 50 nm wide. The laminar coat is separable into two layers; the lamina densa and lamina lucida. In between these two layers can be several different types of ions, including calcium.

Cardiac muscle, like skeletal muscle, is also striated, and the cells contain myofibrils, myofilaments, and sarcomeres as the skeletal muscle cell. The cell membrane is anchored to the cell's cytoskeleton by anchor fibers that are approximately 10 nm wide. These are generally located at the Z lines so that they form grooves, and transverse tubules emanate. In cardiac myocytes, this forms a scalloped surface.

The cytoskeleton is what the rest of the cell builds off of and has two primary purposes: the first is to stabilize the topography of the intracellular components, and the second is to help control the size and shape of the cell. While the first function is important for biochemical processes, the latter is crucial in defining the surface-to-volume ratio of the cell. This heavily influences the potential electrical properties of excitable cells. Additionally, deviation from the standard shape and size of the cell can have a negative prognostic impact.

=== Smooth muscle cells ===
Smooth muscle cells are so-called because they have neither myofibrils nor sarcomeres and therefore no striations. They are found in the walls of hollow organs, including the stomach, intestines, bladder and uterus, in the walls of blood vessels, and in the tracts of the respiratory, urinary, and reproductive systems. In the eyes, the ciliary muscles dilate and contract the iris and alter the shape of the lens. In the skin, smooth muscle cells such as those of the arrector pili cause hair to stand erect in response to cold temperature or fear.

Smooth muscle cells are spindle-shaped with wide middles and tapering ends. They have a single nucleus and range from 30 to 200 micrometers in length. This is thousands of times shorter than skeletal muscle fibers. The diameter of their cells is also much smaller, which removes the need for T-tubules found in striated muscle cells. Although smooth muscle cells lack sarcomeres and myofibrils, they do contain large amounts of the contractile proteins actin and myosin. Actin filaments are anchored by dense bodies (similar to the Z discs in sarcomeres) to the sarcolemma.

== Development ==
A myoblast is an embryonic precursor cell that differentiates to give rise to the different muscle cell types. Differentiation is regulated by myogenic regulatory factors, including MyoD, Myf5, myogenin, and MRF4. GATA4 and GATA6 also play a role in myocyte differentiation.

Skeletal muscle fibers are made when myoblasts fuse together; muscle fibers therefore are cells with multiple nuclei, known as myonuclei, with each cell nucleus originating from a single myoblast. The fusion of myoblasts is specific to skeletal muscle, and not cardiac muscle or smooth muscle.

Myoblasts in skeletal muscle that do not form muscle fibers dedifferentiate back into myosatellite cells. These satellite cells remain adjacent to a skeletal muscle fiber, situated between the sarcolemma and the basement membrane of the endomysium (the connective tissue investment that divides the muscle fascicles into individual fibers). To re-activate myogenesis, the satellite cells must be stimulated to differentiate into new fibers.

Myoblasts and their derivatives, including satellite cells, can now be generated in vitro through directed differentiation of pluripotent stem cells.

Kindlin-2 plays a role in developmental elongation during myogenesis.

== Function ==
=== Muscle contraction in striated muscle ===
==== Skeletal muscle contraction ====
When contracting, thin and thick filaments slide past each other by using adenosine triphosphate. This pulls the Z discs closer together in a process called the sliding filament mechanism. The contraction of all the sarcomeres results in the contraction of the whole muscle fiber. This contraction of the myocyte is triggered by the action potential over the cell membrane of the myocyte. The action potential uses transverse tubules to get from the surface to the interior of the myocyte, which is continuous within the cell membrane. Sarcoplasmic reticula are membranous bags that transverse tubules touch but remain separate from. These wrap themselves around each sarcomere and are filled with Ca^{2+}.

Excitation of a myocyte causes depolarization at its synapses, the neuromuscular junctions, which triggers an action potential. With a singular neuromuscular junction, each muscle fiber receives input from just one somatic efferent neuron. Action potential in a somatic efferent neuron causes the release of the neurotransmitter acetylcholine.

When the acetylcholine is released, it diffuses across the synapse and binds to a receptor on the sarcolemma, a term unique to muscle cells that refers to the cell membrane. This initiates an impulse that travels across the sarcolemma.

When the action potential reaches the sarcoplasmic reticulum, it triggers the release of Ca^{2+} from the Ca^{2+} channels. The Ca^{2+} flows from the sarcoplasmic reticulum into the sarcomere with both of its filaments. This causes the filaments to start sliding and the sarcomeres to become shorter. This requires a large amount of ATP, as it is used in both the attachment and release of every myosin head. Very quickly, Ca^{2+} is actively transported back into the sarcoplasmic reticulum, which blocks the interaction between the thin and thick filaments. This, in turn, causes the muscle cell to relax.

There are four main types of muscle contraction: isometric, isotonic, eccentric, and concentric. Isometric contractions are skeletal muscle contractions that do not cause movement of the muscle, and isotonic contractions are skeletal muscle contractions that do cause movement. Eccentric contraction is when a muscle moves under a load. Concentric contraction is when a muscle shortens and generates force.

==== Cardiac muscle contraction ====
Specialized cardiomyocytes in the sinoatrial node generate electrical impulses that control the heart rate. These electrical impulses coordinate contraction throughout the remaining heart muscle via the electrical conduction system of the heart. Sinoatrial node activity is modulated, in turn, by nerve fibers of both the sympathetic and parasympathetic nervous systems. These systems act to increase and decrease, respectively, the rate of production of electrical impulses by the sinoatrial node.

== Evolution ==
The evolutionary origin of muscle cells in animals is highly debated: One view is that muscle cells evolved once, and thus all muscle cells have a single common ancestor. Another view is that muscles cells evolved more than once, and any morphological or structural similarities are due to convergent evolution, and the development of shared genes that predate the evolution of muscle – even the mesoderm (the germ layer) that gives rise to muscle cells in vertebrates).

Schmid & Seipel (2005) argue that the origin of muscle cells is a monophyletic trait that occurred concurrently with the development of the digestive and nervous systems of all animals, and that this origin can be traced to a single metazoan ancestor in which muscle cells are present. They argue that molecular and morphological similarities between the muscle cells in non-bilaterian Cnidaria and Ctenophora are similar enough to those of bilaterians that there would be one ancestor in metazoans from which muscle cells derive. In this case, Schmid & Seipel argue that the last common ancestor of Bilateria, Ctenophora and Cnidaria, was a triploblast (an organism having three germ layers), and that diploblasty, meaning an organism with two germ layers, evolved secondarily, because they observed the lack of mesoderm or muscle found in most cnidarians and ctenophores. By comparing the morphology of cnidarians and ctenophores to bilaterians, Schmid & Seipel were able to conclude that there were myoblast-like structures in the tentacles and gut of some species of cnidarians and the tentacles of ctenophores. Since this is a structure unique to muscle cells, these scientists determined, based on the data collected by their peers, that this is a marker for striated muscles similar to that observed in bilaterians. The authors also remark that the muscle cells found in cnidarians and ctenophores are often contested due to the origin of these muscle cells being the ectoderm rather than the mesoderm or mesendoderm.

The origin of true muscle cells is argued by other authors to be the endoderm portion of the mesoderm and the endoderm. However, Schmid & Seipel (2005) counter skepticism about whether the muscle cells found in ctenophores and cnidarians are "true" muscle cells, by considering that cnidarians develop through a medusa stage and polyp stage. They note that in the hydrozoans' medusa stage, there is a layer of cells that separates from the distal side of the ectoderm, which forms the striated muscle cells in a way similar to that of the mesoderm; they call this third separated layer of cells the ectocodon. Schmid & Seipel argue that, even in bilaterians, not all muscle cells are derived from the mesendoderm: Their key examples are that in both the eye muscles of vertebrates and the muscles of spiralians, these cells derive from the ectodermal mesoderm, rather than the endodermal mesoderm. Furthermore, they argue that since myogenesis does occur in cnidarians with the help of the same molecular regulatory elements found in the specification of muscle cells in bilaterians, there is evidence for a single origin for striated muscle.

In contrast to this argument for a single origin of muscle cells, Steinmetz, Kraus, et al. (2012) argue that molecular markers such as the myosin II protein used to determine this single origin of striated muscle predate the formation of muscle cells. They use an example of the contractile elements present in the Porifera, or sponges, that do truly lack this striated muscle containing this protein. Furthermore, Steinmetz, Kraus, et al. present evidence for a polyphyletic origin of striated muscle cell development through their analysis of morphological and molecular markers that are present in bilaterians and absent in cnidarians, ctenophores, and bilaterians. Steinmetz, Kraus, et al. showed that the traditional morphological and regulatory markers such as actin, the ability to couple myosin side chains phosphorylation to higher concentrations of the positive concentrations of calcium, and other MyHC elements are present in all metazoans not just the organisms that have been shown to have muscle cells. Thus, the usage of any of these structural or regulatory elements in determining whether or not the muscle cells of the cnidarians and ctenophores are similar enough to the muscle cells of the bilaterians to confirm a single lineage is questionable according to Steinmetz, Kraus, et al. Furthermore, they explain that the orthologues of the Myc genes that have been used to hypothesize the origin of striated muscle occurred through a gene duplication event that predates the first true muscle cells (meaning striated muscle), and they show that the Myc genes are present in the sponges that have contractile elements but no true muscle cells. Steinmetz, Kraus, et al. also showed that the localization of this duplicated set of genes that serve both the function of facilitating the formation of striated muscle genes, and cell regulation and movement genes, was already separated into striated muscle and non-muscle MHC. This separation of the duplicated set of genes is shown through the localization of the striated much to the contractile vacuole in sponges, while the non-muscle much was more diffusely expressed during developmental cell shape and change. Steinmetz, Kraus, et al. found a similar pattern of localization in cnidarians, except with the cnidarian N. vectensis having this striated muscle marker present in the smooth muscle of the digestive tract. Thus, they argue that the pleisiomorphic trait of the separated orthologues of much cannot be used to determine the monophylogeny of muscle, and additionally argue that the presence of a striated muscle marker in the smooth muscle of this cnidarian shows a fundamentally different mechanism of muscle cell development and structure in cnidarians.

Steinmetz, Kraus, et al. (2012) further argue for multiple origins of striated muscle in the metazoans by explaining that a key set of genes used to form the troponin complex for muscle regulation and formation in bilaterians is missing from the cnidarians and ctenophores, and 47 structural and regulatory proteins observed, Steinmetz, Kraus, et al. were not able to find even on unique striated muscle cell protein that was expressed in both cnidarians and bilaterians. Furthermore, the Z-disc seemed to have evolved differently even within bilaterians, and there is a great deal of diversity of proteins developed even between this clade, showing a large degree of radiation for muscle cells. Through this divergence of the Z-disc, Steinmetz, Kraus, et al. argue that there are only four common protein components that were present in all bilaterians muscle ancestors and that of these for necessary Z-disc components only an actin protein that they have already argued is an uninformative marker through its pleisiomorphic state is present in cnidarians. Through further molecular marker testing, Steinmetz et al. observe that non-bilaterians lack many regulatory and structural components necessary for bilaterian muscle formation and do not find any unique set of proteins to both bilaterians and cnidarians and ctenophores that are not present in earlier, more primitive animals such as the sponges and amoebozoans. Through this analysis, the authors conclude that due to the lack of elements that bilaterian muscles are dependent on for structure and usage, non-bilaterian muscles must be of a different origin with a different set of regulatory and structural proteins.

In another take on the argument, Andrikou & Arnone (2015) use the newly available data on gene regulatory networks to look at how the hierarchy of genes and morphogens and another mechanism of tissue specification diverge and are similar among early deuterostomes and protostomes. By understanding not only what genes are present in all bilaterians but also the time and place of deployment of these genes, Andrikou & Arnone discuss a deeper understanding of the evolution of myogenesis.

In their paper, Andrikou & Arnone (2015) argue that to truly understand the evolution of muscle cells, the function of transcriptional regulators must be understood in the context of other external and internal interactions. Through their analysis, Andrikou & Arnone found that there were conserved orthologues of the gene regulatory network in both invertebrate bilaterians and cnidarians. They argue that having this common, general regulatory circuit allowed for a high degree of divergence from a single well-functioning network. Andrikou & Arnone found that the orthologues of genes found in vertebrates had been changed through different types of structural mutations in the invertebrate deuterostomes and protostomes, and they argue that these structural changes in the genes allowed for a large divergence of muscle function and muscle formation in these species. Andrikou & Arnone were able to recognize not only any difference due to mutation in the genes found in vertebrates and invertebrates, but also the integration of species-specific genes that could also cause divergence from the original gene regulatory network function. Thus, although a common muscle patterning system has been determined, they argue that this could be due to a more ancestral gene regulatory network being co-opted several times across lineages with additional genes and mutations causing very divergent development of muscles. Thus, it seems that the myogenic patterning framework may be an ancestral trait. However, Andrikou & Arnone explain that the basic muscle patterning structure must also be considered in combination with the cis regulatory elements present at different times during development. In contrast with the high level of gene family apparatuses structure, Andrikou and Arnone found that the cis-regulatory elements were not well conserved both in time and place in the network, which could show a large degree of divergence in the formation of muscle cells. Through this analysis, it seems that the myogenic GRN is an ancestral GRN with actual changes in myogenic function and structure possibly being linked to later co-opting of genes at different times and places.

Evolutionarily, specialized forms of skeletal and cardiac muscles predated the divergence of the vertebrate/arthropod evolutionary line. This indicates that these types of muscle developed in a common ancestor sometime before 700 million years ago (mya). Vertebrate smooth muscle was found to have evolved independently from the skeletal and cardiac muscle types.

=== Invertebrate muscle cell types ===
The properties used for distinguishing fast, intermediate, and slow muscle fibers can be different for invertebrate flight and jump muscles. To further complicate this classification scheme, the mitochondrial content, and other morphological properties within a muscle fiber, can change in a tsetse fly with exercise and age.

== See also ==
- List of human cell types derived from the germ layers
- List of distinct cell types in the adult human body
