= Myogenic determination factor 5 =

Family of proteins found in eukaryotes

Myf5 domain

Identifiers
- Symbol: Myf5
- Pfam: PF12232
- InterPro: IPR022032
Available protein structures:
- Pfam: structures / ECOD
- PDB: RCSB PDB; PDBe; PDBj
- PDBsum: structure summary

Basic domain
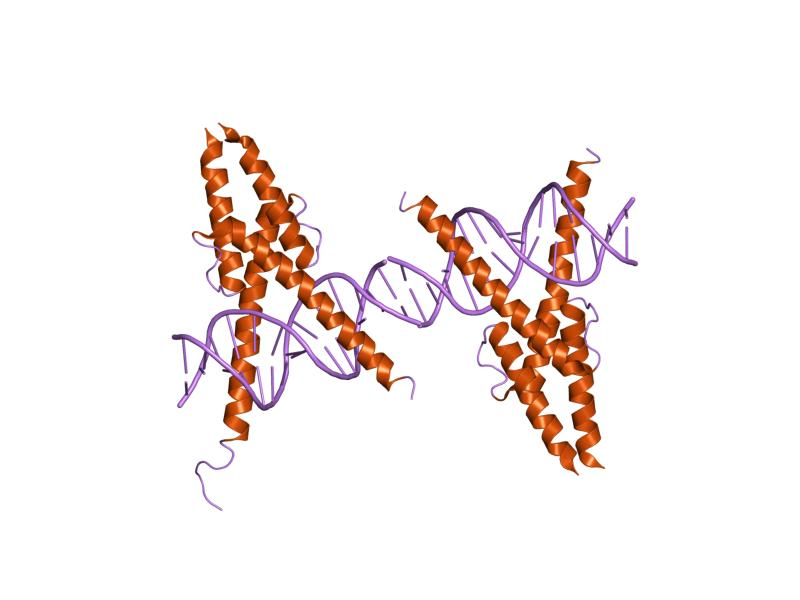
- crystal structure of myod bhlh domain bound to dna: perspectives on dna recognition and implications for transcriptional activation

Identifiers
- Symbol: Basic
- Pfam: PF01586
- InterPro: IPR002546
- PROSITE: PDOC00038
- SCOP2: 1mdy / SCOPe / SUPFAM
Available protein structures:
- Pfam: structures / ECOD
- PDB: RCSB PDB; PDBe; PDBj
- PDBsum: structure summary

In molecular biology, the myogenic determination factor 5 proteins are a family of proteins found in eukaryotes. This family includes the Myf5 protein, which is responsible for directing cells to the skeletal myocyte lineage during development. Myf5 is likely to act in a similar way to the other MRF4 proteins such as MyoD which perform the same function. These are histone acetyltransferases and histone deacetylases which activate and repress genes involved in the myocyte lineage.

Myogenic determination factor 5 proteins contain three conserved protein domains. A C-terminal Myf5 domain, a central basic helix-loop-helix (bHLH) domain and an N-terminal basic domain. The bHLH region mediates specific DNA binding. With 12 residues of the basic domain involved in DNA binding. The basic domain forms an extended alpha helix in the structure.
