= Myosatellite cell =

Precursor cell of skeletal muscle cells

Details

Identifiers
- Latin: myosatellitocytus
- MeSH: D032496
- TH: H2.00.05.2.01020

Myosatellite cells, also known as satellite cells, muscle stem cells or MuSCs, are small multipotent cells with very little cytoplasm found in mature muscle. Satellite cells are precursors to skeletal muscle cells, able to give rise to satellite cells or differentiated skeletal muscle cells. They have the potential to provide additional myonuclei to their parent muscle fiber, or return to a quiescent state. More specifically, upon activation, satellite cells can re-enter the cell cycle to proliferate and differentiate into myoblasts.

Myosatellite cells are located between the basement membrane and the sarcolemma of muscle fibers, and can lie in grooves either parallel or transversely to the longitudinal axis of the fibre. Their distribution across the fibre can vary significantly. Non-proliferative, quiescent myosatellite cells, which adjoin resting skeletal muscles, can be identified by their distinct location between sarcolemma and basal lamina, a high nuclear-to-cytoplasmic volume ratio, few organelles (e.g. ribosomes, endoplasmic reticulum, mitochondria, golgi complexes), small nuclear size, and a large quantity of nuclear heterochromatin relative to myonuclei. On the other hand, activated satellite cells have an increased number of caveolae, cytoplasmic organelles, and decreased levels of heterochromatin. Satellite cells are able to differentiate and fuse to augment existing muscle fibers and to form new fibers. These cells represent the oldest known adult stem cell niche, and are involved in the normal growth of muscle, as well as regeneration following injury or disease.

In undamaged muscle, the majority of satellite cells are quiescent; they neither differentiate nor undergo cell division. In response to mechanical strain, satellite cells become activated. Activated satellite cells initially proliferate as skeletal myoblasts before undergoing myogenic differentiation.

== Structure ==
=== Genetic markers ===
Satellite cells express a number of distinctive genetic markers. Current thinking is that most satellite cells express PAX7 and PAX3. Satellite cells in the head musculature have a unique developmental program, and are Pax3-negative. Moreover, both quiescent and activated human satellite cells can be identified by the membrane-bound neural cell adhesion molecule (N-CAM/CD56/Leu-19), a cell-surface glycoprotein. Myocyte nuclear factor (MNF), and c-met proto-oncogene (receptor for hepatocyte growth factor (HGF)) are less commonly used markers.

CD34 and Myf5 markers specifically define the majority of quiescent satellite cells. Activated satellite cells prove problematic to identify, especially as their markers change with the degree of activation; for example, greater activation results in the progressive loss of Pax7 expression as they enter the proliferative stage. However, Pax7 is expressed prominently after satellite cell differentiation. Greater activation also results in increased expression of myogenic basic helix-loop-helix transcription factors MyoD, myogenin, and MRF4 – all responsible for the induction of myocyte-specific genes. HGF testing is also used to identify active satellite cells. Activated satellite cells also begin expressing muscle-specific filament proteins such as desmin as they differentiate.

The field of satellite cell biology suffers from the same technical difficulties as other stem cell fields. Studies rely almost exclusively on Flow cytometry and fluorescence activated cell sorting (FACS) analysis, which gives no information about cell lineage or behaviour. As such, the satellite cell niche is relatively ill-defined and it is likely that it consists of multiple sub-populations.

== Function ==
=== Muscle repair ===
When muscle cells undergo injury, quiescent satellite cells are released from beneath the basement membrane. They become activated and re-enter the cell cycle. These dividing cells are known as the "transit amplifying pool" before undergoing myogenic differentiation to form new (post-mitotic) myotubes. There is also evidence suggesting that these cells are capable of fusing with existing myofibers to facilitate growth and repair.

The process of muscle regeneration involves considerable remodeling of extracellular matrix and, where extensive damage occurs, is incomplete. Fibroblasts within the muscle deposit scar tissue, which can impair muscle function, and is a significant part of the pathology of muscular dystrophies.

Satellite cells proliferate following muscle trauma and form new myofibers through a process similar to fetal muscle development. After several cell divisions, the satellite cells begin to fuse with the damaged myotubes and undergo further differentiations and maturation, with peripheral nuclei as in hallmark. One of the first roles described for IGF-1 was its involvement in the proliferation and differentiation of satellite cells. In addition, IGF-1 expression in skeletal muscle extends the capacity to activate satellite cell proliferation (Charkravarthy, et al., 2000), increasing and prolonging the beneficial effects to the aging muscle.

== Effects of exercise ==
Satellite cell activation is measured by the extent of proliferation and differentiation. Typically, satellite cell content is expressed per muscle fiber or as a percentage of total nuclear content, the sum of satellite cell nuclei and myonuclei. While the adaptive response to exercise largely varies on an individual basis on factors such as genetics, age, diet, acclimatization to exercise, and exercise volume, human studies have demonstrated general trends.

It is suggested that exercise triggers the release of signaling molecules including inflammatory substances, cytokines and growth factors from surrounding connective tissues and active skeletal muscles. Notably, HGF, a cytokine, is transferred from the extracellular matrix into muscles through the nitric-oxide dependent pathway. It is thought that HGF activates satellite cells, while insulin-like growth factor-I (IGF-1) and fibroblast growth factor (FGF) enhance satellite cell proliferation rate following activation. Studies have demonstrated that intense exercise generally increases IGF-1 production, though individual responses vary significantly. More specifically, IGF-1 exists in two isoforms: mechano growth factor (MGF) and IGF-IEa. While the former induces activation and proliferation, the latter causes differentiation of proliferating satellite cells.

Human studies have shown that both high resistance training and endurance training have yielded an increased number of satellite cells. These results suggest that a light, endurance training regimen may be useful to counteract the age-correlated satellite cell decrease. In high-resistance training, activation and proliferation of satellite cells are evidenced by increased cyclin D1 mRNA, and p21 mRNA levels. This is consistent with the fact that cyclin D1 and p21 upregulation correlates to division and differentiation of cells.

Satellite cell activation has also been demonstrated on an ultrastructural level following exercise. Aerobic exercise has been shown to significantly increase granular endoplasmic reticulum, free ribosomes, and mitochondria of the stimulated muscle groups. Additionally, satellite cells have been shown to fuse with muscle fibers, developing new muscle fibers. Other ultrastructural evidence for activated satellite cells include increased concentration of Golgi apparatus and pinocytotic vesicles.

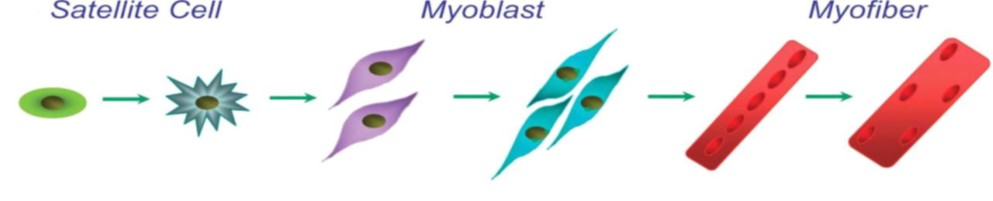
Schematic of myosatellite cell transition into myofiber.

== Satellite cell activation and muscle regeneration ==
Satellite cells have a crucial role in muscle regeneration due to their ability to proliferate, differentiate, and self-renew. Prior to a severe injury to the muscle, satellite cells are in a dormant state. Slight proliferation can occur in times of light injuries but major injuries require greater numbers of satellite cells to activate. The activation of satellite cells from their dormant state is controlled through signals from the muscle niche. This signaling induces an inflammatory response in the muscle tissue. The behavior of satellite cells is a highly regulated process to accommodate the balance between dormant and active states. In times of injury, satellite cells in myofibers receive signals to proliferate from proteins in the crushed skeletal muscle. Myofibers are fundamental elements in muscle made up of actin and myosin myofibrils. The proteins responsible for signaling the activation of satellite cells are called mitogens. A mitogen is a small protein that induces a cell to enter the cell cycle. When the cells receive signals from the neurons, it causes the myofibers to depolarize and release calcium from the sarcoplasmic reticulum. The release of calcium induces the actin and myosin filaments to move and contract the muscle. Studies found that transplanted satellite cells onto myofibers supported multiple regenerations of new muscle tissue. These findings support the hypothesis that satellite cells are the stem cells in muscles. Dependent on their relative position to daughter cells on myofibers, satellite cells undergo asymmetric and symmetric division. The niche and location determines the behavior of satellite cells in their proliferation and differentiation. In general, mammalian skeletal muscle is relatively stable with little myonuclei turnover. Minor injuries from daily activities can be repaired without inflammation or cell death. Major injuries contribute to myofiber necrosis, inflammation, and cause satellite cells to activate and proliferate. The process of myofiber necrosis to myofiber formation results in muscle regeneration.

Muscle regeneration occurs in three overlapping stages. The inflammatory response, activation and differentiation of satellite cells, and maturation of the new myofibers are essential for muscle regeneration. This process begins with the death of damaged muscle fibers where dissolution of myofiber sarcolemma leads to an increase in myofiber permeability. The disruption in myofiber integrity is seen in increased plasma levels in muscle proteins. The death of myofibers drives a calcium influx from the sarcoplasmic reticulum to induce tissue degradation. An inflammatory response follows the necrosis of myofibers. During times of muscle growth and regeneration, satellite cells can travel over between myofibers and muscle and over connective tissue barriers. Signals from the damaged environment induce these behavioral changes in satellite cells.

== Research ==
Upon minimal stimulation, satellite cells in vitro or in vivo will undergo a myogenic differentiation program.

Unfortunately, it seems that transplanted satellite cells have a limited capacity for migration, and are only able to regenerate muscle in the region of the delivery site. As such, systemic treatments or even the treatment of an entire muscle in this way is not possible. However, other cells in the body such as pericytes and hematopoietic stem cells have all been shown to be able to contribute to muscle repair in a similar manner to the endogenous satellite cell. The advantage of using these cell types for therapy in muscle diseases is that they can be systemically delivered, autonomously migrating to the site of injury. Particularly successful recently has been the delivery of mesoangioblast cells into the Golden Retriever dog model of Duchenne muscular dystrophy, which effectively cured the disease. However, the sample size used was relatively small and the study has since been criticized for a lack of appropriate controls for the use of immunosuppressive drugs. Recently, it has been reported that Pax7 expressing cells contribute to dermal wound repair by adopting a fibrotic phenotype through a Wnt/β-catenin mediated process.

=== Regulation ===
Little is known of the regulation of satellite cells. Whilst together PAX3 and PAX7 currently form the definitive satellite markers, Pax genes are notoriously poor transcriptional activators. The dynamics of activation and quiesence and the induction of the myogenic program through the myogenic regulatory factors, Myf5, MyoD, myogenin, and MRF4 remains to be determined.

There is some research indicating that satellite cells are negatively regulated by a protein called myostatin. Increased levels of myostatin up-regulate a cyclin-dependent kinase inhibitor called p21 and thereby inhibit the differentiation of satellite cells.

=== Myosatellite cells and cultured meat ===
Myosatellite cells contribute the most to muscle regeneration and repair. This makes them a prime target for the meat culturing field. These satellite cells are the main source of most muscle cell formation postnatally, with embryonic myoblasts being responsible for prenatal muscle generation. A single satellite cell can proliferate and become a larger amount of muscle cells.

With the understanding that myosatellite cells are the progenitor of most skeletal muscle cells, it was theorized that if these cells could be grown in a lab and placed on scaffolds to make fibers, the muscle cells could then be used for food production. This theory has been proven true with many companies sprouting around the globe in the field of cultured meat including Mosa Meat in the Netherlands, and Upside Foods in the USA.

An overview of the culturing process first involves the selection of a cell source. This initial stage is where the selection of a meat type happens, for example if the desired product is beef then cells are taken from a cow. The next part involves isolating and sorting out the myosatellite cells from whatever the selected cell source was. After being separated into the cellular components, the myosatellite cells need to be proliferated through the use of a bioreactor, a device used to grow microorganisms or cells in a media that can be easily controlled. Whatever media chosen will simulate the cells being in prime condition to proliferate within an organism. After proliferation the cells are shaped using a scaffold. These scaffolds can be an organic structure like decellularized plant or animal tissues, inorganic such as polyacrylamide, or a mix of both. Once the cells have attached themselves to the scaffold and fully matured, they have become a raw meat product. The final step will include any necessary food processes needed for the desired final product.

== See also ==
- List of human cell types derived from the germ layers
- List of distinct cell types in the adult human body
