= GOLGA8H =

Identifiers
- Aliases: GOLGA8H, GOLGA6L11, golgin A8 family member H
- External IDs: HomoloGene: 85511; GeneCards: GOLGA8H; OMA:GOLGA8H - orthologs

Gene location (Human)
| Chr. | Chromosome 15 (human) |
| Band | 15q13.2 | Start | 30,604,028 bp |
| Band | 15q13.2 | End | 30,617,752 bp |
RNA expression pattern
| Bgee | Human / Mouse (ortholog); Top expressed in: sural nerve; Achilles tendon; right testis; Descending thoracic aorta; left testis; ascending aorta; right lobe of thyroid gland; monocyte; left lobe of thyroid gland; apex of heart / n/a; More reference expression data |
| BioGPS | n/a |
Orthologs
| Species | Human | Mouse |
| Entrez | 728498 | n/a |
| Ensembl | ENSG00000261794 | n/a |
| UniProt | P0CJ92 | n/a |
| RefSeq (mRNA) | NM_001282490 | n/a |
| RefSeq (protein) | NP_001269419 | n/a |
| Location (UCSC) | Chr 15: 30.6 – 30.62 Mb | n/a |
| PubMed search | | n/a |
- Wikidata
| View/Edit Human |

Golgin subfamily A member 8H, also known as GOLGA8H, is a protein that in Homo sapiens is encoded by the GOLGA8H gene. Function of the GOLGA8H involves a process that is carried out at the cellular level which results in the assembly, arrangement of constituent parts, or disassembly of the Golgi apparatus.

== Gene ==
=== Aliases ===
The most common aliases for GOLGA8H are the following:

- Golgin A8 Family Member H 2 3 5 or Member H 2
- Golgi Autoantigen, Golgin Subfamily A, 6-Like 11 2 3
- Golgin Subfamily A Member 8H 3 4
- Golgin Subfamily A Member 8-Like Protein 1 3
- GOLGA6L11

=== Prevalence and Location ===
GOLGA8H, when compared to many other genes, exists in many different places that span multiple chromosomes:. NCBI lists the gene’s location on the long (q) arm on Chromosome 15 in the q13.2 region, from 30,604,030 - 30,617,827 (13,798 nt in length)

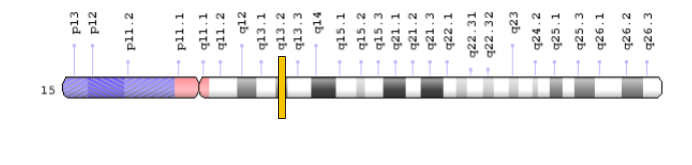
Location of GOLGA8H on chromosome 15 q13.2 region

In actuality, when running the FASTA protein sequence of GOLGA8H on BLAT (the BLAST-Like Alignment Tool), it is found to exist in 85 or 87 different locations (depending on an individual’s sex chromosomes). 81 copies of the protein exist on chromosome 15, one copy each on chromosomes 7, 9,10, and 12, and two copies on the Y chromosome

Copies of GOLGA8H in Homo Sapiens

| Chromosome: | Number of Copies: |
|---|---|
| Chromosome 7 | 1 |
| Chromosome 9 | 1 |
| Chromosome 10 | 1 |
| Chromosome 15 | 81 |
| Y Chromosome | 2 |
| | TOTAL: |
| | 85 (XX chromosomes*) |
| | 87 (XY chromosomes*) |

=== Neighborhood ===
It would be tedious and inefficient to list all gene neighborhoods for the 87 locations of GOLGA8H. Thus, here are surrounding genes of GOLGA8H on chromosome 15 in the q13.2 region listed on NCBI:

Gene Neighborhood of GOLGA8H on Chromosome 15 q13.2 in Homo sapiens:

| Gene | Additional information |
|---|---|
| LOC106736468 | Gamma inversion proximal recombination region |
| ARHGAP11B | Rho GTPase activating protein |
| LOC106736476 | Proximal CHRNA7 low-copy repeat recombination region |
| DNM1P50 | Pseudogene of DNM1, which is involved in producing microtubule bundles that is additionally able to bind and hydrolyze GTP |
| LOC106736480 | Proximal microdeletion recombination region |
| ULK4P2 | Pseudogene of ULK4, which encodes a member of the unc-51-like serine/threonine kinase (STK) family, in which members play a role in neuronal growth and endocytosis |
| RN7SL628P | Pseudogene stemming from cytoplasmic 7SL, an RNA component of the SRP (signal recognition particle) |
| LOC106783506 | A nonconserved acetylation island sequence 49 enhancer which can function as an enhancer in Jurkat T cells |

== Transcript ==
There are no isoforms of GOLGA8H.

== Multiple Sequence Alignment ==
=== Paralogs ===
A multiple sequence alignment (MSA) of GOLGA8H and its top seven paralogs was created using Clustal Omega [1]. [Appendix A] All eight genes from the Golgin Subfamily A Member 8 group were 632 amino acids in length [1]. All 632 amino acids of GOLGA8H and its top seven paralogs were analyzed and compared using Clustal Omega were analyzed and compared in an attempt to understand what makes Golgin Subfamily A Member 8H, GOLGA8H, a distinct entity. Two amino acids make GOLGA8H unique: Valine at amino acid 32 and Cysteine at amino acid 169. For all seven paralogs, the amino acid in position 32 is Isoleucine and the amino acid in position 169 is Arginine

== Protein ==
The predicted molecular weight of GOLGA8H, rounded down to three significant figures, is 71.3 kDa. This is a theoretical value; predicted molecular weights are merely based on the amino acids present in the protein. The theoretical isoelectric point of GOLGA8H, rounded down to one significant figure, is a pI of 8

=== Composition ===
When compared to other human proteins, GOLGA8H is semi glutamine- and glutamate-enriched. In contrast, GOLGA8H is depleted in threonine, phenylalanine, and tyrosene.

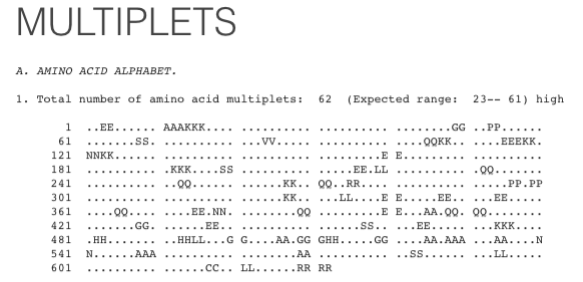
Amino Acid Multiplets in GOLGA8H retrieved via Statistical Analysis of Protein Sequences (SAPS)

There are no charge runs, hydrophobic segments, or transmembrane domains in the GOLGA8H protein. There are 62 amino acid multiplets for the protein, which is higher than the expected range. It also has amino acid patterns with high periodicity

=== Motifs ===
There are 11 motifs present in GOLGA8H:. The single experimentally-verified motif is a glutamine-rich protein located in the 323-416 amino acid region.

GOLGA8H Motifs
| Motif # | Motif Information |
| 1 | N-Glycosylation site |
| 2 | cAMP- and cGMP-dependent protein kinase phosphorylation site |
| 3 | Casein kinase II phosphorylation site |
| 4 | N-myristoylation site |
| 5 | Protein kinase C phosphorylation site |
| 6 | Alanine-rich region profile |
| 7 | Glutamine-rich region profile (experimentally verified) |
| 8 | K-box domain profile |
| 9 | Bipartite nuclear localization signal profile |
| 10 | HCaRG protein |
| 11 | Involucrin repeat |

=== Post-Translational Modifications ===
GOLGA8H is predicted to undergo phosphorylation at multiple locations of serine, threonine, and tyrosine throughout its structure. It is expected to undergo phosphorylation most frequently on serine amino acids. Furthermore, there is one predicted N-linked glycosylation site, which occurs at amino acid 39. The sequence for this site is NGS. N-linked glycosylation functions intrinsically and extrinsically to assist in regulating the migration patterns of cells.

=== Primary Sequence ===
The protein is 632 amino acids long. It has 19 exons and two polyadenylation signals. Its sequence only partially matches a Kozak consensus sequence.

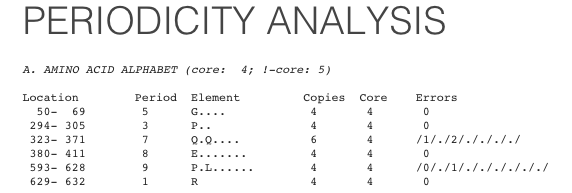
Amino Acid Periodicity in GOLGA8H retrieved via Statistical Analysis of Protein Sequences (SAPS)

=== Secondary Structure ===
The predicted secondary structure of GOLGA8H is composed of 81% alpha helices, 25.6% beta sheets, and 17.2% turns.

Using Phyre2, 284 residues (45% of GOLGA8H) was modeled with 97.8% confidence by the single highest scoring template. This structure shows an extremely high proportion of alpha helices:

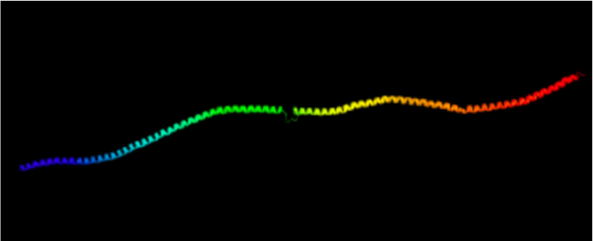
284 residues (45% of GOLGA8H) was modeled with 97.8% confidence by the single highest scoring template. The N-terminus begins on the red side and goes down the rainbow to the C-terminus (blue side).

=== Tertiary Structure ===
A predicted model for a tertiary structure of GOLGA8H was generated using I-TASSER

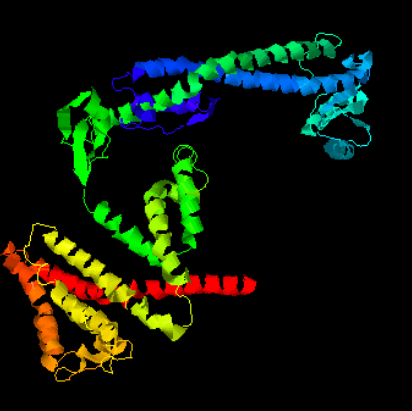
I-TASSER Predicted Tertiary Structure of GOLGA8H. The N-terminus begins on the red side and goes down the rainbow to the C-terminus (blue side).

== Transcript level regulation ==
=== Promoter ===
There is one promoter for the GOLGA8H gene, GXP_2235212, which is 1197 nt long. It lies from base pairs 30,603,030 to 30,604,226 on the positive strand

=== Transcription Factor Binding Sites ===
Several transcription factors are predicted to bind to the promoter sequence. Some examples include:

- Myoblast determining factors
- MAF- and AP1-related factors
- GATA binding factors
- E-box binding factors
- AP4 and related proteins
- Brachyury gene, mesoderm developmental factor
- Peroxisome proliferator-activated receptor
- CCAAT binding factors

== Homology and evolution ==
=== Paralogs ===
GOLGA8H has several dozen paralogs. There are seven paralogs with identity similarities above 90%, charted below under GOLGA8H (included as a reference point):

GOLGA8H Paralogs (>90% Similarity)
| # | Gene Name | Accession # | Similarity (%) |
| 1. | GOLGA8H | NP_001269419.1 | 100.0 |
| 2. | GOLGA8J | NP_001269401.1 | 97.8 |
| 3. | GOLGA8T | NP_001342398.1 | 97.2 |
| 4. | GOLGA8K | NP_001269422.1 | 93.5 |
| 5. | GOLGA8I pseudogene | A6NC78.2 | 96.0 |
| 6. | GOLGA8M | NP_001269397.1 | 95.9 |
| 7. | GOLGA8O | NP_001264237.1 | 90.7 |
| 8. | GOLGA8N | NP_001269423.1 | 90.4 |

=== Orthologs ===
Putting the amino acid sequence of GOLGA8H through a protein BLAST via NCBI does not yield any hits for orthologs:. However, putting the same sequence through BLAT (the BLAST-Like Alignment Tool) yields multiple orthologs

GOLGA8H Orthologs (Inclusion criteria: 1+ Characterized Chromosome Locations or 50+ BLAT Hits)
| Organism Common Name | Scientific name | Divergence (MYA) | BLAT Hits | Main Chromosome Location | Other Chromosome Locations |
|---|---|---|---|---|---|
| Human | Homo sapiens | - | 87 | Chromosome 15 | Chromosomes 7, 9, 10, 12, Y |
| Rhesus Macaque | Macaca mulatta | 6 | 70 | Uncharacterized** | Chromosomes 2, 3, 7, 9, 11, 15 |
| Golden Snub-Nosed Monkey | Rhinopithecus roxellana | 6 | 54 | Uncharacterized** | - |
| Olive Baboon | Papio anubis | 9 | 45 | Uncharacterized** | Chromosomes 2, 7, 9, 11 |
| Gorilla | Gorilla gorilla | 15 | 37 | Chromosome 15 | Chromosomes 7, 10, 12 |
| Crab-Eating Macaque | Macaca fascicularis | 20 | 36 | Chromosome 7 | Chromosomes 2, 3, 6, 9, 11, 15 |
| Chimpanzee | Pan troglodytes | 29 | 35 | Chromosome 15 | Chromosomes 7, 8, 12, Y |
| Bornean orangutan | Pongo pygmaeus | 29 | 34 | Chromosome 15 | Chromosomes 5, 7, 9, 10, 12, 19 |
| Bonobo | Pan paniscus | 29 | 25 | Chromosome 15 | Chromosomes 6, 7, 9, 10, 12 |
| Northern White-Cheeked Gibbon | Nomascus leucogenys | 29 | 24 | Chromosome 6 | Chromosomes 5, 8, 10, 16, 17, 18 |
| Green Monkey | Chlorocebus sabaeus | 29 | 21 | Chromosome 26 | Chromosomes 9, 11, 12, 21, 22, 29 |
| Proboscis Monkey | Nasalis larvatus | 29 | 19 | Chromosome 7 | Chromosomes 3, 9, 11, 15 |
| Common Marmoset | callithrix jacchus | 42 | 4 | Chromosome 6 | Chromosome 9 |
| Horse (Domesticated) | Equus ferus caballus | 89 | 3 | Chromosome 29 | Chromosome 25 |
| Gray Short-Tailed Opossum | Monodelphis domestica | 94 | 3 | Chromosome 3 | - |
| Common House Mouse | Mus musculus | 94 | 3 | Chromosome 11 | - |
| Dog (Domesticated) | Canis familiaris | 94 | 3 | Chromosome 15 | - |
| Taurine Cow | Bos taurus | 160 | 1 | Chromosome 13 | - |

**Chromosomes labeled as 'uncharacterized' have clone contigs (an assembled set of overlapping DNA sequences) that cannot be confidently placed on a specific chromosome. Similar contigs are concatenated together into short pseudo-chromosomes.

== Expression ==
Data from NCBI shows that GOLGA8H in Homo sapiens has the strongest expression is through the thyroid and testis, with RKPMs of 12.2 and 12.1 respectively. It is also expressed in lesser amounts in 25 other tissues. Data from GEO DataSet show the tissue expression is highest in bone marrow and pancreas tissue. However, samples from all tissues were above the 90th percentile, indicating that the expression value of that gene is much higher in respect to all other genes on the array.

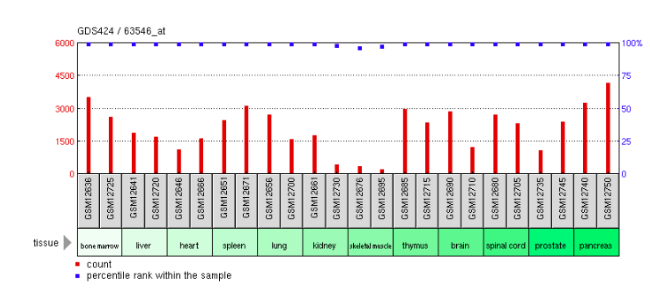
Normal Human Tissue Expression Profiling for GOLGA8H. Two samples are used for each tissue type. Red bars represent count and blue squares represent relative percentile rank within the sample.

When comparing GOLGA8H tissue expression in abnormal conditions to normal human tissue levels, there is not significant deviation in its expression with any variable. This supports the notion that GOLGA8H is ubiquitous.

== Interactions ==
GOLGA8H has been shown to interact with Ubiquitin C (UBC). UBC is a polyubiquitin precursor. Polyubiquitin precursors are a chain of the protein ubiquitin that can be turned into an active form by post-translational modifications. This can mark proteins for degradation, alter their cellular location, affect their activity, and promote or prevent protein interactions. Further research on the link between ubiquitin and the Golgi apparatus include a reliance on ubiquitin to achieve certain processes around the Golgi apparatus.

String db lists the following genes as interacting with GOLGA8H:

Genes Interacting with GOLGA8H:
| Gene Name | Full Name | Accession Number | Experimentally- Determined | Coexpression | Text Mining |
| STX5 | Syntaxin 5 | NC_000011.10 | ✓ | ✓ | ✓ |
| GORASP1 | Golgi reassembly stacking protein 1 | NC_000003.12 | ✓ | ✓ | ✓ |
| GOSR1 | Golgi SNAP receptor complex member 1 | NC_000017.1 | ✓ | ✗ | ✓ |
| USO1 | USO1 vesicle transport factor | NC_000004.12 | ✓ | ✗ | ✓ |
| GOLGB1 | Golgin B1 | NC_000003.12 | ✓ | ✓ | ✓ |

== Splice variants ==
The Homo sapiens GOLGA8H gene has 1 splice variant
