= Myogenic regulatory factors =

Group of proteins regulating myogenesis

Myogenic regulatory factors (MRF) are basic helix-loop-helix (bHLH) transcription factors that regulate myogenesis: MyoD, Myf5, myogenin, and MRF4.

These proteins contain a conserved basic DNA binding domain that binds the E box DNA motif. They dimerize with other HLH containing proteins through an HLH-HLH interaction.

== MRF Gene Family Evolution ==
There are typically four vertebrate MRF paralogues which are homologous to typically a single MRF gene in non-vertebrates. These four genes are thought to have been duplicated in the two rounds of whole-genome duplication early in vertebrate evolution that played a role in the evolution of more complex vertebrate body plans. The four MRFs have four distinct expression profiles, though with some redundancy, as MyoD and Myf5 are both involved in myoblast determination, and are followed by the activation of Myf6 (MRF4) and Myog in myoblast differentiation. There have also been instances of independent duplication of the MRFs in invertebrate lineages, similarly followed by subfunctionalization of the expression of the genes in time and/or in space. In amphioxus, an invertebrate chordate closely related to vertebrates, there are five MRFs which are expressed in different patterns during development.
