= C2C12 =

Mouse myoblast cell line

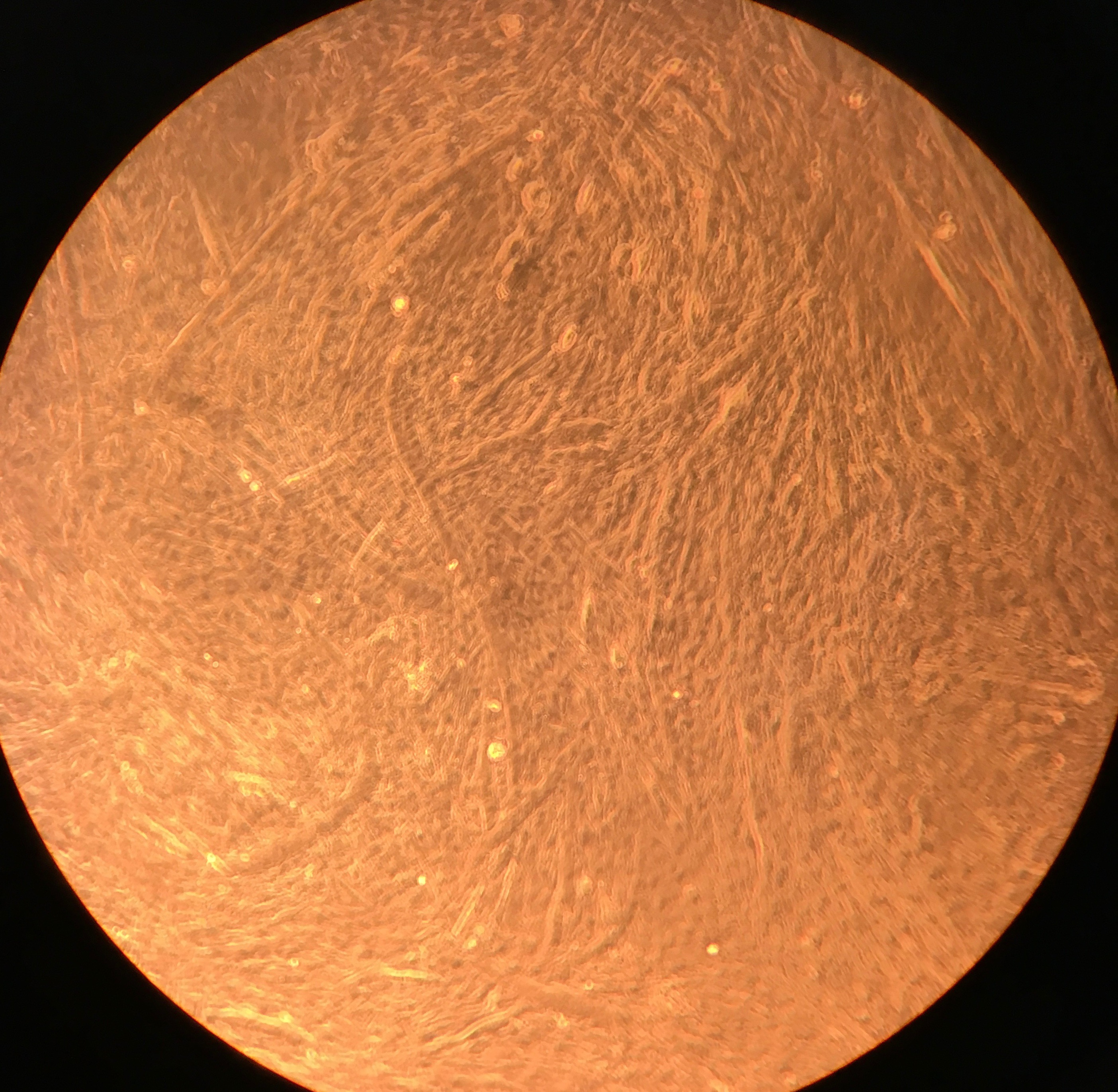
C2C12 myotubes under light microscope, 10x magnification

C2C12 is an immortalized mouse myoblast cell line. The C2C12 cell line is a subclone of myoblasts that were originally obtained by Yaffe and Saxel at the Weizmann Institute of Science in Israel in 1977. Developed for in vitro studies of myoblasts isolated from the complex interactions of in vivo conditions, C2C12 cells are useful in biomedical research. These cells are capable of rapid proliferation under high serum conditions and differentiation into myotubes under low serum conditions. Mononucleated myoblasts can later fuse to form multinucleated myotubes under low serum conditions or starvation, leading to the precursors of contractile skeletal muscle cells in the process of myogenesis. C2C12 cells are used to study the differentiation of myoblasts, osteoblasts, and myogenesis, to express various target proteins, and to explore mechanistic biochemical pathways.

== Morphology ==
Wild-type C2C12 cells have a radial branching morphology consisting of long fibers extending in many directions. C2C12 cells can be cultured in a variety of conditions to induce specific responses of interest. For example, assisted by the cell line's high differentiation rate and fusion rate, fibronectin templates can be micro-plated to petri dishes or cell culture flasks in order to induce specific growth patterns, such as that of skeletal muscle cell interactions with extracellular matrix components. The introduction of adhesion molecules can alter the growth pattern of C2C12 cells to a longitudinal distribution exhibiting polarity. There are many ways to regulate the shape of C2C12 myoblasts genetically and environmentally, from stress, to cytoskeleton alteration, to growth factors. The scaffolding of C2C12 cells is particularly important for studying muscle tissue regeneration post-injury or after tissue wasting due to disease or ICU rehabilitation.

== Uses in research ==
C2C12 cells have been shown to effectively incorporate exogenous cDNA and nucleic acids by transfection. In the piloting research originally conducted by Yaffe and Saxel, C2C12 were obtained through serial passage of myoblasts cultured from the thigh muscle of C3H mice after crush injury. In their study, a set of C2C12 cells were cultured from normal mouse myoblasts, which were cultured from two-month-old C3H mice after crush injury. Within two days, the normal cells differentiated into spindle-shaped mononucleated myoblasts. After four days, multinucleated myotube networks formed, and a few days after, sarcomeres and Z-lines could be observed. In contrast, the dystrophic cells formed shortened fibers covered in fibroblasts, a hallmark of muscle wasting.

C2C12 cells demonstrate rapid development and maturation into functional skeletal muscle cells or cardiac muscle cells, having the ability to contract and generate force. The rate of muscle formation from C2C12 cells can be controlled by the introduction of loss-of-functions genes vital for the fusion of myoblasts and myogenesis. Under necrotic conditions, such as tumor necrosis factor alpha (TNF-α), direct protein loss, particularly myosin heavy chain protein, in C2C12 skeletal muscle cells has been shown. C2C12 cells were used to elucidate inactivated X chromosome (Xi) replication during early S-phase of the cell cycle and is regulated epigenetically. C2C12 cells are especially convenient for studying the cell cycle due to its high division rate.

Most laboratories today use the C2C12 subclone developed by Helen Blau from the original cell line by Yaffe and Saxel. These cells are immortalized, which means that they proliferate indefinitely due to a genetic mutation. The mutation that causes this in C2C12 skeletal muscle cells is believed to be in the INK4a gene (CDKN2A).

== Electrical pulse stimulation ==
Electrical pulse stimulation (EPS) is an in vitro method used to mimic muscle contraction in cultured cells, enabling the study of exercise‐related adaptations such as changes in metabolism, mitochondrial function, and gene expression. In C2C12 myotubes, EPS can be applied to investigate processes like glucose uptake, insulin sensitivity, and muscle fatigue. A systematic review of 54 published studies found that the most commonly used settings include a voltage of 10–20 V, pulse duration of 2 ms, a frequency of 1 Hz, and stimulation periods of around 24 hours. The exact protocol should be determined based on the goal of the experiment.
