= DEC1 =

Protein-coding gene in the species Homo sapiens

DELEC1

Identifiers
- Aliases: DELEC1, CTS9, deleted in esophageal cancer 1, DEC1
- External IDs: OMIM: 604767; GeneCards: DELEC1; OMA:DELEC1 - orthologs

Gene location (Human)
Chr.	Chromosome 9 (human)
Band	9q33.1	Start	114,850,968 bp
Band	9q33.1	End	115,402,644 bp
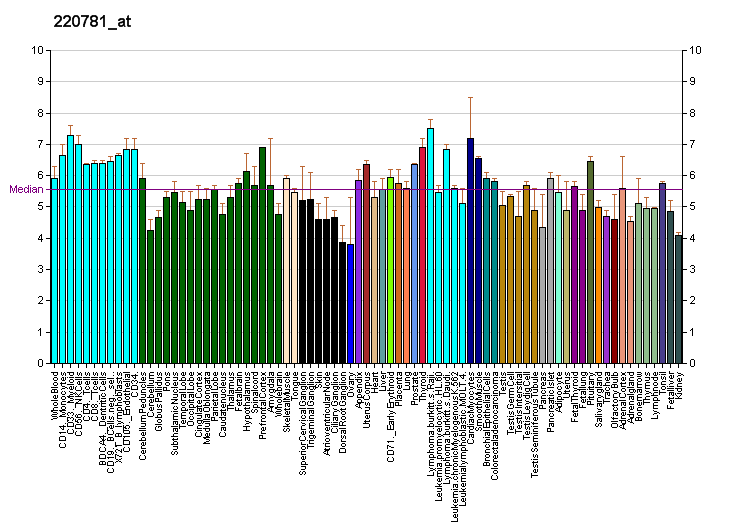
RNA expression pattern
Bgee	Human / Mouse (ortholog); Top expressed in: testicle; gonad; granulocyte; monocyte; Achilles tendon; sural nerve; popliteal artery; tibial arteries; smooth muscle tissue; stromal cell of endometrium / n/a; More reference expression data
BioGPS	More reference expression data
Orthologs
Species	Human	Mouse
Entrez	50514	n/a
Ensembl	ENSG00000173077	n/a
UniProt	Q9P2X7	n/a
RefSeq (mRNA)	NM_017418	n/a
RefSeq (protein)	NP_059114	n/a
Location (UCSC)	Chr 9: 114.85 – 115.4 Mb	n/a
PubMed search		n/a
- Wikidata
View/Edit Human

Deleted in esophageal cancer 1 is a protein that in humans is encoded by the DEC1 gene.

== Function ==
The function of this gene is not known. This gene is located in a region commonly deleted in esophageal squamous cell carcinomas. Gene expression is reduced or absent in these carcinomas, associated with lymph node metastasis, and thus this is a candidate tumor suppressor gene for esophageal squamous cell carcinomas.
