= MyoD =

Mammalian protein found in Homo sapiens

MYOD1
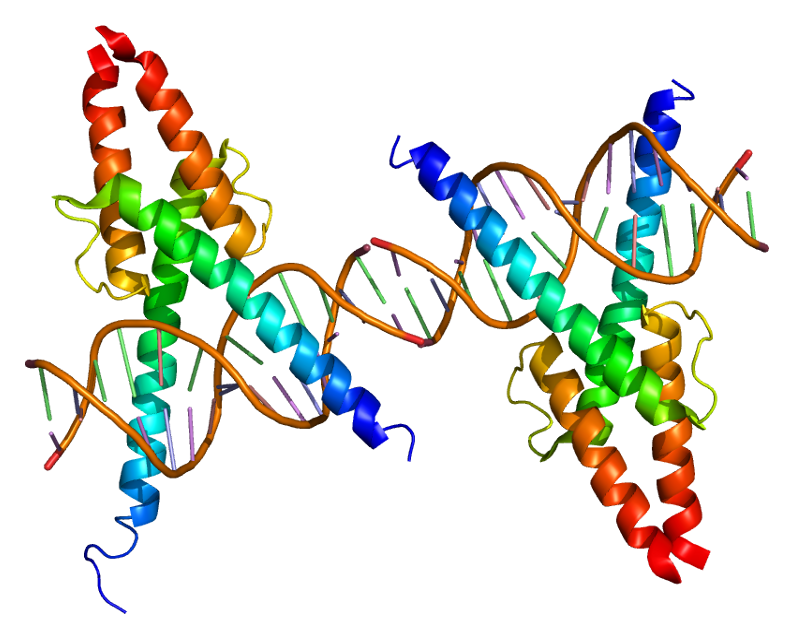

Identifiers
- Aliases: MYOD1, MYF3, MYOD, PUM, bHLHc1, myogenic differentiation 1, MYODRIF
- External IDs: OMIM: 159970; MGI: 97275; GeneCards: MYOD1
Available structures
PDB	Ortholog search: PDBe RCSB
PDB	List of PDB id codes 1MDY

Gene location (Human)
Chr.	Chromosome 11 (human)
Band	11p15.1	Start	17,719,571 bp
Band	11p15.1	End	17,722,136 bp

Gene location (Mouse)
Chr.	Chromosome 7 (mouse)
Band	7 B3|7 30.03 cM	Start	46,025,898 bp
Band	7 B3|7 30.03 cM	End	46,028,523 bp
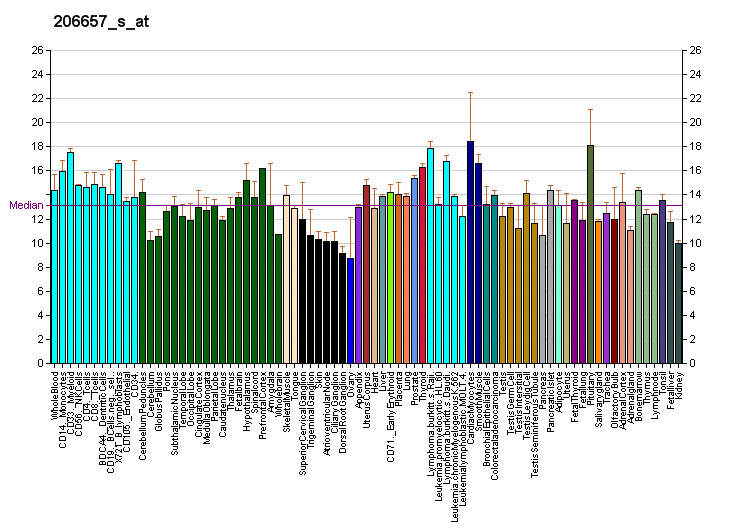
RNA expression pattern
Bgee	Human / Mouse (ortholog); Top expressed in: triceps brachii muscle; Skeletal muscle tissue of biceps brachii; glutes; vastus lateralis muscle; Skeletal muscle tissue of rectus abdominis; muscle of thigh; gastrocnemius muscle; testicle; deltoid muscle; gonad / Top expressed in: myotome; wrist; tongue muscle; muscle of thigh; triceps brachii muscle; sternocleidomastoid muscle; temporal muscle; skeletal muscle tissue; knee joint; extensor digitorum longus muscle; More reference expression data
BioGPS	More reference expression data
Gene ontology
Molecular function	DNA binding; sequence-specific DNA binding; RNA polymerase II transcription regulatory region sequence-specific DNA binding; protein dimerization activity; DNA-binding transcription activator activity, RNA polymerase II-specific; DNA-binding transcription factor activity; transcription factor binding; chromatin binding; RNA polymerase II cis-regulatory region sequence-specific DNA binding; E-box binding; protein binding; protein heterodimerization activity; enzyme binding; transcription factor activity, RNA polymerase II distal enhancer sequence-specific binding; chromatin DNA binding; ubiquitin protein ligase binding; transcription coactivator activity; DNA-binding transcription factor activity, RNA polymerase II-specific; promoter-specific chromatin binding
Cellular component	transcription regulator complex; nucleoplasm; myofibril; nucleus; cytoplasm; cytosol; nuclear body
Biological process	cell differentiation; myotube differentiation; regulation of transcription, DNA-templated; regulation of transcription by RNA polymerase II; cellular response to starvation; muscle cell fate commitment; cellular response to estradiol stimulus; skeletal muscle fiber adaptation; muscle organ development; regulation of alternative mRNA splicing, via spliceosome; myotube cell development; positive regulation of skeletal muscle fiber development; negative regulation of myoblast proliferation; transcription, DNA-templated; multicellular organism development; positive regulation of transcription, DNA-templated; protein phosphorylation; regulation of RNA splicing; positive regulation of myoblast fusion; myoblast fate determination; cellular response to glucocorticoid stimulus; positive regulation of myoblast differentiation; skeletal muscle fiber development; histone H3 acetylation; myotube differentiation involved in skeletal muscle regeneration; histone H4 acetylation; skeletal muscle cell differentiation; positive regulation of skeletal muscle tissue regeneration; regulation of gene expression; striated muscle cell differentiation; cellular response to oxygen levels; myoblast fusion; myoblast differentiation; skeletal muscle tissue development; positive regulation of transcription by RNA polymerase II; transcription by RNA polymerase II; positive regulation of muscle cell differentiation; cellular response to tumor necrosis factor; positive regulation of snRNA transcription by RNA polymerase II
Sources:Amigo / QuickGO
Orthologs
Databases	NCBI: entry; OMA: entry
Species	Human	Mouse
Entrez	4654	17927
Ensembl	ENSG00000129152	ENSMUSG00000009471
UniProt	P15172	P10085
RefSeq (mRNA)	NM_002478	NM_010866
RefSeq (protein)	NP_002469	NP_034996
Location (UCSC)	Chr 11: 17.72 – 17.72 Mb	Chr 7: 46.03 – 46.03 Mb
PubMed search
- Wikidata
View/Edit Human	View/Edit Mouse

MyoD, also known as myoblast determination protein 1, is a protein in animals that plays a major role in regulating muscle differentiation. MyoD, which was discovered in the laboratory of Harold M. Weintraub, belongs to a family of proteins known as myogenic regulatory factors (MRFs). These bHLH (basic helix loop helix) transcription factors act sequentially in myogenic differentiation. Vertebrate MRF family members include MyoD1, Myf5, myogenin, and MRF4 (Myf6). In non-vertebrate animals, a single MyoD protein is typically found.

MyoD is one of the earliest markers of myogenic commitment. MyoD is expressed at extremely low and essentially undetectable levels in quiescent satellite cells, but expression of MyoD is activated in response to exercise or muscle tissue damage. The effect of MyoD on satellite cells is dose-dependent; high MyoD expression represses cell renewal, promotes terminal differentiation and can induce apoptosis. Although MyoD marks myoblast commitment, muscle development is not dramatically ablated in mouse mutants lacking the MyoD gene. This is likely due to functional redundancy from Myf5 and/or Mrf4. Nevertheless, the combination of MyoD and Myf5 is vital to the success of myogenesis.

== History ==
MyoD was cloned by a functional assay for muscle formation reported in Cell in 1987 by Davis, Weintraub, and Lassar. It was first described as a nuclear phosphoprotein in 1988 by Tapscott, Davis, Thayer, Cheng, Weintraub, and Lassar in Science. The researchers expressed the complementary DNA (cDNA) of the murine MyoD protein in a different cell lines (fibroblast and adipoblast) and found MyoD converted them to myogenic cells. The following year, the same research team performed several tests to determine both the structure and function of the protein, confirming their initial proposal that the active site of the protein consisted of the helix loop helix (now referred to as basic helix loop helix) for dimerization and a basic site upstream of this bHLH region facilitated DNA binding only once it became a protein dimer. MyoD has since been an active area of research as still relatively little is known concerning many aspects of its function.

== Function ==
The function of MyoD in development is to commit mesoderm cells to a skeletal myoblast lineage, and then to regulate that continued state. MyoD may also regulate muscle repair. MyoD mRNA levels are also reported to be elevated in aging skeletal muscle.

One of the main actions of MyoD is to remove cells from the cell cycle (halt proliferation for terminal cell cycle arrest in differentiated myocytes) by enhancing the transcription of p21 and myogenin. MyoD is inhibited by cyclin dependent kinases (CDKs). CDKs are in turn inhibited by p21. Thus MyoD enhances its own activity in the cell in a feedforward manner.

Sustained MyoD expression is necessary for retaining the expression of muscle-related genes.

MyoD is also an important effector for the fast-twitch muscle fiber (types IIA, IIX, and IIB) phenotype.

== Mechanisms ==
MyoD is a transcription factor and can also direct chromatin remodelling through binding to a DNA motif known as the E-box. MyoD is known to have binding interactions with hundreds of muscular gene promoters and to permit myoblast proliferation. While not completely understood, MyoD is now thought to function as a major myogenesis controller in an on/off switch association mediated by KAP1 (KRAB [Krüppel-like associated box]-associated protein 1) phosphorylation. KAP1 is localized at muscle-related genes in myoblasts along with both MyoD and Mef2 (a myocyte transcription enhancer factor). Here, it serves as a scaffold and recruits the coactivators p300 and LSD1, in addition to several corepressors which include G9a and the Histone deacetylase HDAC1. The consequence of this coactivator/corepressor recruitment is silenced promoting regions on muscle genes. When the kinase MSK1 phosphorylates KAP1, the corepressors previously bound to the scaffold are released allowing MyoD and Mef2 to activate transcription.

Once the "master controller" MyoD has become active, SETDB1 is required to maintain MyoD expression within the cell. Setdb1 appears to be necessary to maintain both MyoD expression and also genes that are specific to muscle tissues because reduction of Setdb1 expression results in a severe delay of myoblast differentiation and determination. In Setdb1 depleted myoblasts that are treated with exogenous MyoD, myoblastic differentiation is successfully restored. In one model of Setdb1 action on MyoD, Setdb1 represses an inhibitor of MyoD. This unidentified inhibitor likely acts competitively against MyoD during typical cellular proliferation. Evidence for this model is that reduction of Setdb1 results in direct inhibition of myoblast differentiation which may be caused by the release of the unknown MyoD inhibitor.

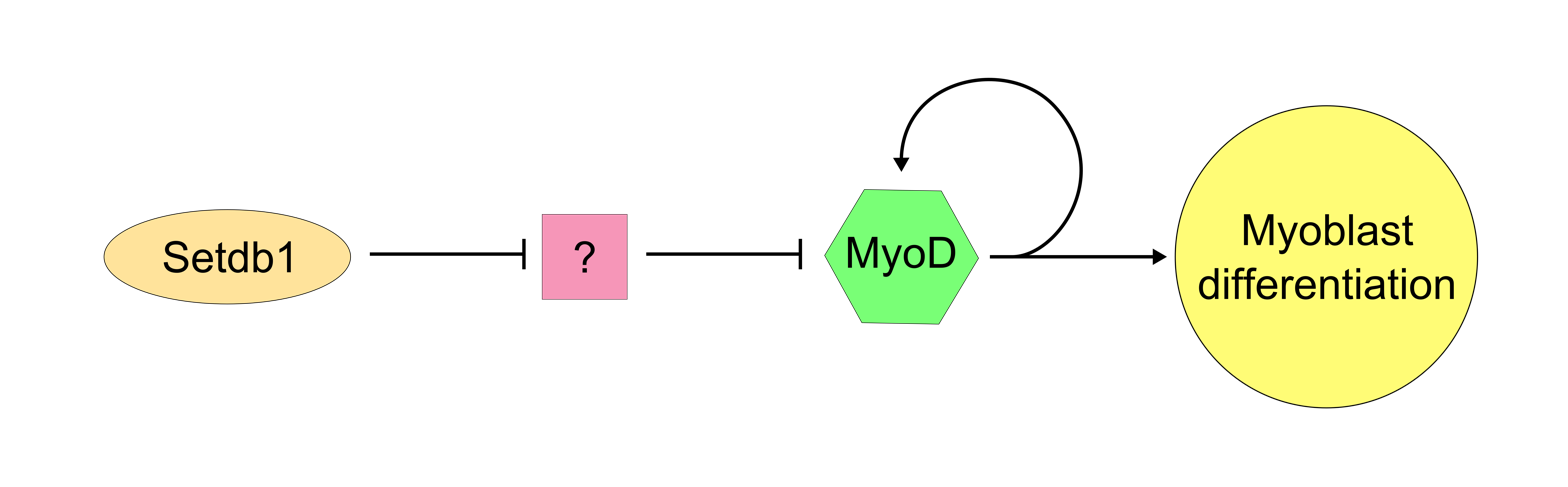
Evidence suggests that Setdb1 inhibits a repressor of MyoD and this is the mechanism through which MyoD expression is retained in differentiated myoblasts.

MyoD has also been shown to function cooperatively with the tumor suppressor gene, Retinoblastoma (pRb) to cause cell cycle arrest in the terminally differentiated myoblasts. This is done through regulation of the Cyclin, Cyclin D1. Cell cycle arrest (in which myoblasts would indicate the conclusion of myogenesis) is dependent on the continuous and stable repression of the D1 cyclin. Both MyoD and pRb are necessary for the repression of cyclin D1, but rather than acting directly on cyclin D1, they act on Fra-1 which is immediately early of cyclin D1. MyoD and pRb are both necessary for repressing Fra-1 (and thus cyclin D1) as either MyoD or pRb on its own is not sufficient alone to induce cyclin D1 repression and thus cell cycle arrest. In an intronic enhancer of Fra-1 there were two conserved MyoD binding sites discovered. There is cooperative action of MyoD and pRb at the Fra-1 intronic enhancer that suppresses the enhancer, therefore suppressing cyclin D1 and ultimately resulting in cell cycle arrest for terminally differentiated myoblasts.

== Wnt signalling can affect MyoD ==
Wnt signalling from adjacent tissues has been shown to induce cells in somites that receive these Wnt signals to express Pax3 and Pax7 in addition to myogenic regulatory factors, including Myf5 and MyoD. Specifically, Wnt3a can directly induce MyoD expression via cis-element interactions with a distal enhancer and Wnt response element. Wnt1 from dorsal neural tube and Wnt6/Wnt7a from surface ectoderm have also been implicated in promoting myogenesis in the somite; the latter signals may act primarily through Myod.

In typical adult muscles in a resting condition (absence of physiological stress) the specific Wnt family proteins that are expressed are Wnt5a, Wnt5b, Wnt7a and Wnt4. When a muscle becomes injured (thus requiring regeneration) Wnt5a, Wnt5b, and Wnt7a are increased in expression. As the muscle completes repair Wnt7b and Wnt3a are increased as well. This patterning of Wnt signalling expression in muscle cell repair induces the differentiation of the progenitor cells, which reduces the number of available satellite cells. Wnt plays a crucial role in satellite cell regulation and skeletal muscle aging and also regeneration. Wnts are known to active the expression of Myf5 and MyoD by Wnt1 and Wnt7a. Wnt4, Wnt5, and Wnt6 function to increase the expression of both of the regulatory factors but at a more subtle level. Additionally, MyoD increases Wnt3a when myoblasts undergo differentiation. Whether MyoD is activated by Wnt via cis-regulation direct targeting or through indirect physiological pathways remains to be elucidated.

== Coactivators and repressors ==
IFRD1 is a positive cofactor of MyoD, as it cooperates with MyoD at inducing the transcriptional activity of MEF2C (by displacing HDAC4 from MEF2C); moreover IFRD1 also represses the transcriptional activity of NF-κB, which is known to inhibit MyoD mRNA accumulation.

NFATc1 is a transcription factor that regulates composition of fiber type and the fast-to-slow twitch transition resulting from aerobic exercise requires the expression of NFATc1. MyoD expression is a key transcription factor in fast twitch fibers which is inhibited by NFATc1 in oxidative fiber types. NFATc1 works to inhibit MyoD via a physical interaction with the MyoD N-terminal activation domain resulting in inhibited recruitment of the necessary transcriptional coactivator p300. NFATc1 physically disrupts the interaction between MyoD and p300. This establishes the molecular mechanism by which fiber types transition in vivo through exercise with opposing roles for NFATc1 and MyoD. NFATc1 controls this balance by physical inhibition of MyoD in slow-twitch muscle fiber types.

MyoD works with a transient placeholder protein that functions to prevent other transcription factors from binding to the DNA and also retains an inactive conformation for the DNA. Once the placeholder is removed (or possibly deactivated) the necessary transcription factors are free to bind and initiate recruitment of RNA Polymerase II and initiate active RNA transcription.

The histone deacetyltransferase p300 functions with MyoD in an interaction that is essential for the myotube generation from fibroblasts that is mediated by MyoD. Recruitment of p300 is the rate-limiting process in the conversion of fibroblasts to myotubes. In addition to p300, MyoD is also known to recruit Set7, H3K4me1, H3K27ac, and RNAP II to the enhancer that is bound with and this allows for the activation of muscle gene that is condition-specific and established by MyoD recruitment. Endogenous p300 though, is necessary for MyoD functioning by acting as an essential coactivator. MyoD associatively binds to the enhancer region in conjunction with a placeholding "putative pioneer factor" which helps to establish and maintain a both of them in a specific and inactive conformation. Upon the removal or inactivation on the placeholder protein bound to the enhancer, the recruitment of the additional group of transcription factors that help to positively regulate enhancer activity is permitted and this results in the MyoD-transcription factor-enhancer complex to assume a transcriptionally active state.

== Interactions ==
MyoD has been shown to interact with:

- C-jun,
- CREB-binding protein,
- CSRP3,
- Cyclin-dependent kinase 4,
- Cyclin-dependent kinase inhibitor 1C,
- EP300,
- HDAC1,
- ID1,
- ID2,
- MDFI,
- MOS,
- Retinoblastoma protein,
- Retinoid X receptor alpha
- STAT3, and
- TCF3.
