= LBX1 =

Protein-coding gene in the species Homo sapiens

Identifiers
- Aliases: LBX1, HPX-6, HPX6, LBX1H, homeobox, ladybird homeobox 1, CCHS3
- External IDs: OMIM: 604255; MGI: 104867; GeneCards: LBX1

Gene location (Human)
Chr.	Chromosome 10 (human)
Band	10q24.32	Start	101,226,994 bp
Band	10q24.32	End	101,229,463 bp

Gene location (Mouse)
Chr.	Chromosome 19 (mouse)
Band	19|19 C3	Start	45,221,123 bp
Band	19|19 C3	End	45,224,251 bp
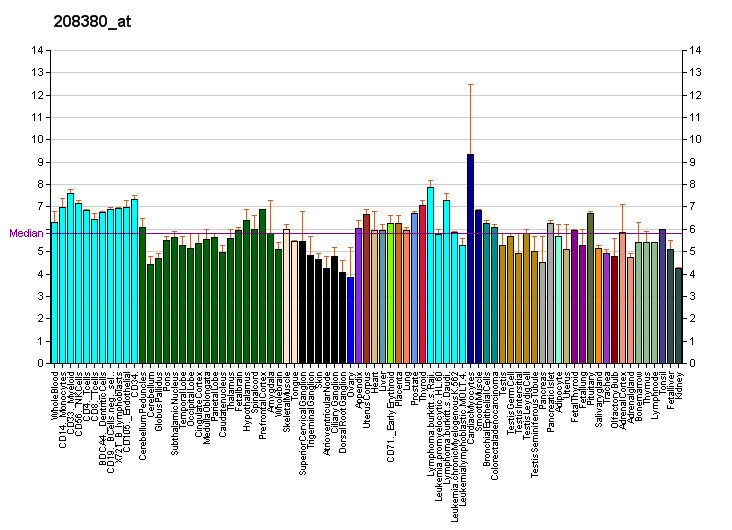
RNA expression pattern
Bgee	Human / Mouse (ortholog); Top expressed in: gastrocnemius muscle; muscle of thigh; testicle; skeletal muscle tissue; right hemisphere of cerebellum; C1 segment; right lung; frontal lobe; Cortex of frontal lobe; dorsolateral prefrontal cortex / Top expressed in: triceps brachii muscle; muscle of thigh; lumbar subsegment of spinal cord; ankle; vastus lateralis muscle; gastrocnemius muscle; tibialis anterior muscle; skeletal muscle tissue; zygote; soleus muscle; More reference expression data
BioGPS	More reference expression data
Gene ontology
Molecular function	DNA-binding transcription factor activity; sequence-specific DNA binding; DNA binding; DNA-binding transcription factor activity, RNA polymerase II-specific
Cellular component	nucleus; transcription regulator complex
Biological process	multicellular organism development; heart looping; anatomical structure morphogenesis; cell differentiation; muscle organ development; neuron fate commitment; spinal cord motor neuron differentiation; regulation of transcription, DNA-templated; negative regulation of neuron differentiation; neuron fate determination; transcription, DNA-templated; nervous system development; negative regulation of cell population proliferation
Sources:Amigo / QuickGO
Orthologs
Databases	NCBI: entry; OMA: entry
Species	Human	Mouse
Entrez	10660	16814
Ensembl	ENSG00000138136	ENSMUSG00000025216
UniProt	P52954	P52955
RefSeq (mRNA)	NM_006562	NM_010691
RefSeq (protein)	NP_006553	NP_034821
Location (UCSC)	Chr 10: 101.23 – 101.23 Mb	Chr 19: 45.22 – 45.22 Mb
PubMed search
- Wikidata
View/Edit Human	View/Edit Mouse

Transcription factor LBX1 is a protein that in humans is encoded by the LBX1 gene.

This gene and the orthologous mouse gene were found by their homology to the Drosophila lady bird early and late homeobox genes.

In the mouse, this gene is a key regulator of muscle precursor cell migration and is required for the acquisition of dorsal identities of forelimb muscles.
