= Myogenin =

Mammalian protein found in humans

MYOG

Identifiers
- Aliases: MYOG, MYF4, bHLHc3, myf-4, myogenin (myogenic factor 4), myogenin
- External IDs: OMIM: 159980; MGI: 97276; GeneCards: MYOG

Gene location (Human)
| Chr. | Chromosome 1 (human) |
| Band | 1q32.1 | Start | 203,083,129 bp |
| Band | 1q32.1 | End | 203,086,012 bp |

Gene location (Mouse)
| Chr. | Chromosome 1 (mouse) |
| Band | 1 E4|1 58.18 cM | Start | 134,217,727 bp |
| Band | 1 E4|1 58.18 cM | End | 134,220,286 bp |
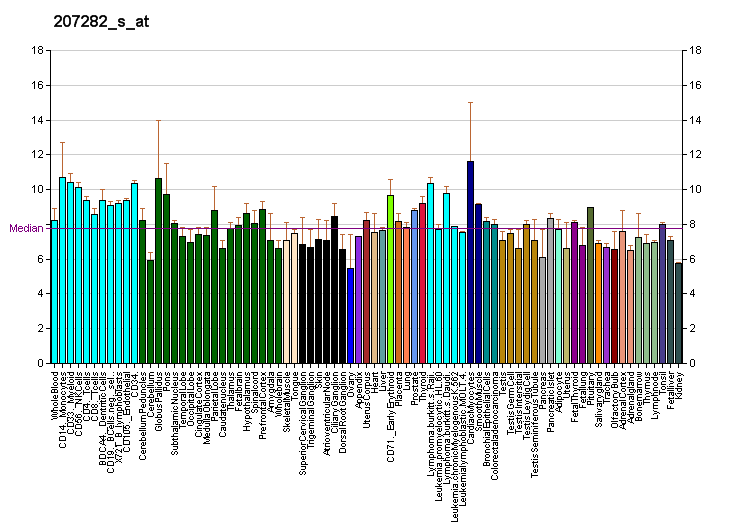
RNA expression pattern
| Bgee | Human / Mouse (ortholog); Top expressed in: muscle of thigh; gastrocnemius muscle; glutes; triceps brachii muscle; Skeletal muscle tissue of rectus abdominis; Skeletal muscle tissue of biceps brachii; vastus lateralis muscle; tibialis anterior muscle; jejunum; mouth / Top expressed in: myotome; superior surface of tongue; internal carotid artery; human fetus; pineal gland; plantaris muscle; dermis; ankle joint; extraocular muscle; muscle of thigh; More reference expression data |
| BioGPS | More reference expression data |
Gene ontology
| Molecular function | sequence-specific DNA binding; DNA binding; RNA polymerase II transcription regulatory region sequence-specific DNA binding; protein dimerization activity; DNA-binding transcription factor activity; DNA-binding transcription activator activity, RNA polymerase II-specific; cis-regulatory region sequence-specific DNA binding; RNA polymerase II cis-regulatory region sequence-specific DNA binding; E-box binding; protein binding; protein heterodimerization activity; transcription factor activity, RNA polymerase II distal enhancer sequence-specific binding; chromatin DNA binding; DNA-binding transcription factor activity, RNA polymerase II-specific |
| Cellular component | transcription regulator complex; protein-DNA complex; nucleus; nucleoplasm |
| Biological process | cellular response to retinoic acid; positive regulation of myotube differentiation; cell differentiation; myotube differentiation; negative regulation of glycolytic process; regulation of transcription, DNA-templated; cellular response to lithium ion; ossification; positive regulation of muscle cell differentiation; response to muscle activity involved in regulation of muscle adaptation; muscle cell fate commitment; cellular response to growth factor stimulus; cellular response to estradiol stimulus; positive regulation of oxidative phosphorylation; muscle organ development; striated muscle atrophy; mRNA transcription by RNA polymerase II; cellular response to magnetism; positive regulation of skeletal muscle fiber development; transcription, DNA-templated; multicellular organism development; positive regulation of transcription, DNA-templated; response to gravity; positive regulation of myoblast fusion; positive regulation of muscle atrophy; skeletal muscle tissue regeneration; positive regulation of myoblast differentiation; skeletal muscle fiber development; response to electrical stimulus involved in regulation of muscle adaptation; skeletal muscle atrophy; skeletal muscle cell differentiation; response to denervation involved in regulation of muscle adaptation; cell cycle; regulation of myoblast fusion; myoblast differentiation; regulation of skeletal muscle satellite cell proliferation; skeletal muscle tissue development; response to muscle activity; positive regulation of transcription by RNA polymerase II; negative regulation of cell population proliferation; cellular response to tumor necrosis factor |
Sources:Amigo / QuickGO
Orthologs
| Databases | NCBI: entry; OMA: entry |
| Species | Human | Mouse |
| Entrez | 4656 | 17928 |
| Ensembl | ENSG00000122180 | ENSMUSG00000026459 |
| UniProt | P15173 | P12979 |
| RefSeq (mRNA) | NM_002479 | NM_031189 |
| RefSeq (protein) | NP_002470 | NP_112466 |
| Location (UCSC) | Chr 1: 203.08 – 203.09 Mb | Chr 1: 134.22 – 134.22 Mb |
| PubMed search |
- Wikidata
| View/Edit Human | View/Edit Mouse |

Myogenin is a transcriptional activator encoded by the MYOG gene. Myogenin is a muscle-specific basic-helix-loop-helix (bHLH) transcription factor involved in the coordination of skeletal muscle development or myogenesis and repair. Myogenin is a myogenic regulatory factor (MRF), other examples of which also include MyoD, Myf5, and MRF4.

In mice, myogenin is essential for the development of functional skeletal muscle. Myogenin is required for the proper differentiation of most myogenic precursor cells during the process of myogenesis. When the DNA coding for myogenin was knocked out of the mouse genome, severe skeletal muscle defects were observed. Mice lacking both copies of myogenin (homozygous-null) suffer from perinatal lethality due to the lack of mature secondary skeletal muscle fibers throughout the body.

In cell culture, myogenin can induce myogenesis in a variety of non-muscle cell types.

== Interactions ==
Myogenin has been shown to interact with:

- MDFI,
- POLR2C,
- Serum response factor
- Sp1 transcription factor, and
- TCF3.
