= MYF5 =

Protein-coding gene in the species Homo sapiens

Identifiers
- Aliases: MYF5, bHLHc2, myogenic factor 5, EORVA
- External IDs: OMIM: 159990; MGI: 97252; GeneCards: MYF5

Gene location (Human)
Chr.	Chromosome 12 (human)
Band	12q21.31	Start	80,716,912 bp
Band	12q21.31	End	80,719,671 bp

Gene location (Mouse)
Chr.	Chromosome 10 (mouse)
Band	10 D1|10 55.95 cM	Start	107,318,769 bp
Band	10 D1|10 55.95 cM	End	107,321,995 bp
RNA expression pattern
Bgee	Human / Mouse (ortholog); Top expressed in: biceps brachii; muscle of thigh; gastrocnemius muscle; skeletal muscle tissue; deltoid muscle; tibialis anterior muscle; body of tongue; exocrine gland; salivary gland; male reproductive gland / Top expressed in: myotome; urethra; male urethra; human fetus; extraocular muscle; muscle layer of urethra; soleus muscle; muscle of upper limb; internal carotid artery; temporal muscle; More reference expression data
BioGPS	n/a
Gene ontology
Molecular function	DNA binding; sequence-specific DNA binding; protein dimerization activity; DNA-binding transcription activator activity, RNA polymerase II-specific; RNA polymerase II cis-regulatory region sequence-specific DNA binding; E-box binding; protein binding; protein heterodimerization activity; transcription factor activity, RNA polymerase II distal enhancer sequence-specific binding; DNA-binding transcription factor activity, RNA polymerase II-specific
Cellular component	nucleoplasm; RNA polymerase II transcription regulator complex; nucleus
Biological process	somitogenesis; embryonic skeletal system morphogenesis; cell differentiation; regulation of transcription, DNA-templated; muscle organ morphogenesis; ossification; positive regulation of muscle cell differentiation; regulation of transcription by RNA polymerase II; muscle cell fate commitment; muscle organ development; extracellular matrix organization; transcription by RNA polymerase II; positive regulation of skeletal muscle fiber development; transcription, DNA-templated; regulation of cell-matrix adhesion; multicellular organism development; positive regulation of myoblast fusion; positive regulation of myoblast differentiation; muscle tissue morphogenesis; skeletal muscle cell differentiation; camera-type eye development; skeletal muscle tissue development; cartilage condensation; positive regulation of transcription by RNA polymerase II
Sources:Amigo / QuickGO
Orthologs
Databases	NCBI: entry; OMA: entry
Species	Human	Mouse
Entrez	4617	17877
Ensembl	ENSG00000111049	ENSMUSG00000000435
UniProt	P13349	P24699
RefSeq (mRNA)	NM_005593	NM_008656
RefSeq (protein)	NP_005584	NP_032682
Location (UCSC)	Chr 12: 80.72 – 80.72 Mb	Chr 10: 107.32 – 107.32 Mb
PubMed search
- Wikidata
View/Edit Human	View/Edit Mouse

Myogenic factor 5 is a protein that in humans is encoded by the MYF5 gene. It is a protein with a key role in regulating muscle differentiation or myogenesis, specifically the development of skeletal muscle. Myf5 belongs to a family of proteins known as myogenic regulatory factors (MRFs). These basic helix loop helix transcription factors act sequentially in myogenic differentiation. MRF family members include Myf5, MyoD (Myf3), myogenin, and MRF4 (Myf6). This transcription factor is the earliest of all MRFs to be expressed in the embryo, where it is only markedly expressed for a few days (specifically around 8 days post-somite formation and lasting until day 14 post-somite in mice). It functions during that time to commit myogenic precursor cells to become skeletal muscle. In fact, its expression in proliferating myoblasts has led to its classification as a determination factor. Furthermore, Myf5 is a master regulator of muscle development, possessing the ability to induce a muscle phenotype upon its forced expression in fibroblastic cells.

== Expression ==
Myf5 is expressed in the dermomyotome of the early somites, pushing the myogenic precursors to undergo determination and differentiate into myoblasts. Specifically, it is first seen in the dorsomedial portion of the dermomyotome, which develops into the epaxial myotome. Although it is expressed in both the epaxial (to become muscles of the back) and hypaxial (body wall and limb muscles) portions of the myotome, it is regulated differently in these tissue lines, providing part of their alternative differentiation. Most notably, while Myf5 is activated by Sonic hedgehog in the epaxial lineage, it is instead directly activated by the transcription factor Pax3 in hypaxial cells. The limb myogenic precursors (derived from the hypaxial myotome) do not begin expressing Myf5 or any MRFs, in fact, until after migration to the limb buds. Myf5 is also expressed in non-somitic paraxial mesoderm that forms muscles of the head, at least in zebrafish.

While the product of this gene is capable of directing cells towards the skeletal muscle lineage, it is not absolutely required for this process. Numerous studies have shown redundancy with two other MRFs, MyoD and MRF4. The absence of all three of these factors results in a phenotype with no skeletal muscle. These studies were performed after it was shown that Myf5 knockouts had no clear abnormality in their skeletal muscle. The high redundancy of this system shows how crucial the development of skeletal muscle is to the viability of the fetus. Some evidence shows that Myf5 and MyoD are responsible for the development of separate muscle lineages, and are not expressed concurrently in the same cell. Specifically, while Myf5 plays a large role in the initiation of epaxial development, MyoD directs the initiation of hypaxial development, and these separate lineages can compensate for the absence of one or the other. This has led some to claim that they are not indeed redundant, though this depends on the definition of the word. Still, the existence of these separate "MyoD-dependent" and "Myf5-dependent" subpopulations has been disputed, with some claiming that these MRFs are indeed coexpressed in muscle progenitor cells. This debate is ongoing.

Although Myf5 is mainly associated with myogenesis, it is expressed in other tissues, as well. Firstly, it is expressed in brown adipose precursors. However, its expression is limited to brown and not white adipose precursors, providing part of the developmental separation between these two lineages. Furthermore, Myf5 is expressed in portions of the neural tube (that go on to form neurons) a few days after it is seen in the somites. This expression is eventually repressed to prevent extraneous muscle formation. Although the specific roles and dependency of Myf5 in adipogenesis and neurogenesis have remained to be explored, these findings show that Myf5 may play roles outside of myogenesis. Myf5 also has an indirect role controlling proximal rib development. Although Myf5 knockouts have normal skeletal muscle, they die due to abnormalities in their proximal ribs that make it difficult to breathe.

Despite only being present for a few days during embryonic development, Myf5 is still expressed in certain adult cells. As one of the key cell markers of satellite cells (the stem cell pool for skeletal muscles), it plays an important role in the regeneration of adult muscle. Specifically, it allows a brief pulse of proliferation of these satellite cells in response to injury. Differentiation begins (regulated by other genes) after this initial proliferation. In fact, if Myf5 is not downregulated, differentiation does not occur.

In zebrafish, Myf5 is the first MRF expressed in embryonic myogenesis and is required for adult viability, even though larval muscle forms normally. As no muscle is formed in Myf5;Myod double mutant zebrafish, Myf5 cooperates with Myod to promote myogenesis.

== Regulation ==
The regulation of Myf5 is dictated by a large number of enhancer elements that allow a complex system of regulation. Although most events throughout myogenesis that involve Myf5 are controlled through the interaction of multiple enhancers, there is one important early enhancer that initiates expression. Termed the early epaxial enhancer, its activation provides the "go" signal for expression of Myf5 in the epaxial dermomyotome, where it is first seen. Sonic hedgehog from the neural tube acts at this enhancer to activate it. Following that, the chromosome contains different enhancers for regulation of Myf5 expression in the hypaxial region, cranial region, limbs, etc. This early expression of Myf5 in the epaxial dermamyotome is involved with the very formation of myotome, but nothing beyond that. After its initial expression, other enhancer elements dictate where and how long it is expressed. It remains clear that each population of myogenic progenitor cells (for different locations in the embryo) is regulated by a different set of enhancers.

== Clinical significance ==
As for its clinical significance, the aberration of this transcription factor provides part of the mechanism for how hypoxia (lack of oxygen) can influence muscle development. Hypoxia has the ability to impede muscle differentiation in part by inhibiting the expression of Myf5 (as well as other MRFs). This prevents the muscle precursors from becoming post-mitotic muscle fibers. Although hypoxia is a teratogen, this inhibition of expression is reversible, therefore it remains unclear if there is a connection between hypoxia and birth defects in the fetus.
