= MYF6 =

Protein-coding gene in the species Homo sapiens

Identifiers
- Aliases: MYF6, CNM3, MRF4, bHLHc4, myf-6, Myf6, myogenic factor 6
- External IDs: OMIM: 159991; MGI: 97253; GeneCards: MYF6

Gene location (Human)
Chr.	Chromosome 12 (human)
Band	12q21.31	Start	80,707,634 bp
Band	12q21.31	End	80,709,474 bp

Gene location (Mouse)
Chr.	Chromosome 10 (mouse)
Band	10 D1|10 55.96 cM	Start	107,328,714 bp
Band	10 D1|10 55.96 cM	End	107,330,598 bp
RNA expression pattern
Bgee	Human / Mouse (ortholog); Top expressed in: glutes; Skeletal muscle tissue of rectus abdominis; triceps brachii muscle; gastrocnemius muscle; biceps brachii; muscle of thigh; deltoid muscle; thoracic diaphragm; Skeletal muscle tissue of biceps brachii; quadriceps femoris muscle / Top expressed in: muscle of thigh; temporal muscle; medial head of gastrocnemius muscle; sternocleidomastoid muscle; triceps brachii muscle; digastric muscle; intercostal muscle; soleus muscle; extraocular muscle; quadriceps femoris muscle; More reference expression data
BioGPS	n/a
Gene ontology
Molecular function	DNA binding; protein dimerization activity; DNA-binding transcription factor activity; DNA-binding transcription activator activity, RNA polymerase II-specific; RNA polymerase II cis-regulatory region sequence-specific DNA binding; E-box binding; protein heterodimerization activity; transcription factor activity, RNA polymerase II distal enhancer sequence-specific binding; DNA-binding transcription factor activity, RNA polymerase II-specific
Cellular component	nucleoplasm; RNA polymerase II transcription regulator complex; nucleus
Biological process	somitogenesis; cell differentiation; regulation of transcription, DNA-templated; positive regulation of muscle cell differentiation; regulation of transcription by RNA polymerase II; muscle cell fate commitment; muscle organ development; transcription by RNA polymerase II; positive regulation of skeletal muscle fiber development; multicellular organism development; positive regulation of transcription, DNA-templated; positive regulation of myoblast fusion; skeletal muscle tissue regeneration; positive regulation of myoblast differentiation; muscle tissue morphogenesis; skeletal muscle cell differentiation; negative regulation of transcription, DNA-templated; skeletal muscle tissue development; positive regulation of transcription by RNA polymerase II
Sources:Amigo / QuickGO
Orthologs
Databases	NCBI: entry; OMA: entry
Species	Human	Mouse
Entrez	4618	17878
Ensembl	ENSG00000111046	ENSMUSG00000035923
UniProt	P23409	P15375
RefSeq (mRNA)	NM_002469	NM_008657
RefSeq (protein)	NP_002460	NP_032683
Location (UCSC)	Chr 12: 80.71 – 80.71 Mb	Chr 10: 107.33 – 107.33 Mb
PubMed search
- Wikidata
View/Edit Human	View/Edit Mouse

Myogenic factor 6 (also known as Mrf4 or herculin) is a protein that in humans is encoded by the MYF6 gene. This gene is also known in the biomedical literature as MRF4 and herculin. MYF6 is a myogenic regulatory factor (MRF) involved in the process known as myogenesis.

== Function ==
MYF6/Mrf4 is a member of the myogenic factor (MRF) family of transcription factors that regulate skeletal muscle myogenesis and muscle regeneration. Myogenic factors are basic helix-loop-helix (bHLH) transcription factors. MYF6 is a gene that encodes a protein involved in the regulation of myogenesis. The precise role(s) of Myf6/Mrf4 in myogenesis are unclear, although in mice it is able to initiate myogenesis in the absence of Myf5 and MyoD, two other MRFs. The portion of the protein integral to myogenesis regulation requires the basic helix-loop-helix (bHLH) domain that is conserved among all of the genes in the MRF family.

MYF6 is expressed exclusively in skeletal muscle, and it is expressed at a higher levels in adult skeletal muscle than all of the other MRF family genes. In mouse, Myf6/Mrf4 differs somewhat from the other MRF genes due to its two-phase expression. Initially, Myf6 is transiently expressed along with Myf-5 in the somites during the early stages of myogenesis. However, it is more noticeably expressed postnatally. This suggests that it serves an important role in the maintenance and repair of adult skeletal muscle.

The MYF6 gene is physically linked to the MYF5 gene on chromosome 12, and similar linkage is observed in all vertebrates. Mutations in the mouse Myf6 gene typically exhibit reduced levels of Myf5. Despite reductions in muscle mass of the back and defective rib formation, Myf6 mutants still exhibit fairly normal skeletal muscle. This demonstrates that Myf6 is not essential for the formation of most myofibers, at least in the strains of mice tested.

In zebrafish, Myf6/Mrf4 is expressed in all terminally differentiated muscle examined, but expression has not been reported in muscle precursor cells.

== Clinical significance ==
Mutations in the MYF6 gene are associated with autosomal dominant centronuclear myopathy (ADCNM) and Becker's muscular dystrophy.
