= Non-rhabdomyosarcoma soft tissue sarcomas =

Malignant tumors of soft tissues excluding skeletal muscle tissue

Non-rhabdomyosarcoma soft tissue sarcoma
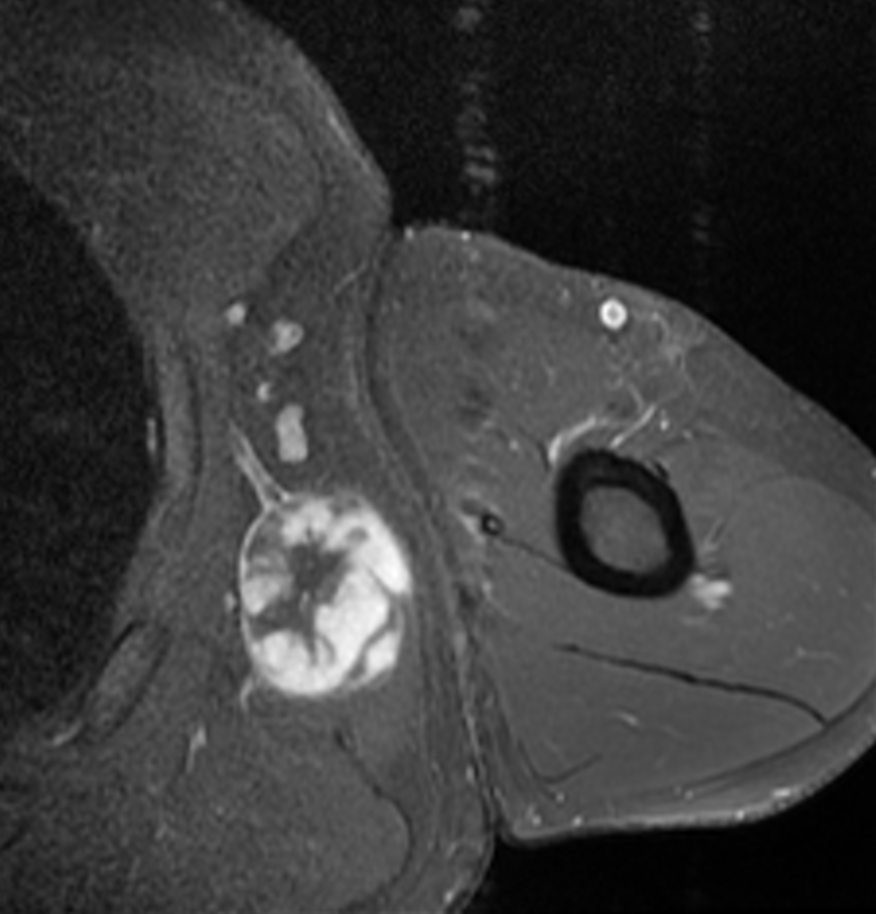
- MRI of myxoid liposarcoma in the left axillary region, highlighted by its white color
- Specialty: Oncology
- Symptoms: Numbness, weakness, pain, swelling, or organ dysfunction near site of tumor
- Treatment: Surgery, chemotherapy, radiation therapy
- Frequency: 4% of childhood cancers

Non-rhabdomyosarcoma soft tissue sarcomas (NRSTS) are malignant tumors that develop in soft tissue (muscle, tendon, fat, etc.) but which do not possess features of skeletal muscle tissue. NRSTS are a type of sarcoma: tumors which originate from an embryonic tissue known as mesenchyme. As an embryo develops, cells of the mesenchyme differentiate into a diverse variety of cells including bone cells, cartilage cells, muscle cells and fat cells.

NRSTS are all sarcomas that do not show features of bone or muscle tissue. There are over 50 histological subtypes of NRSTS, and they comprise 4% of childhood cancers. The proportion of soft tissue sarcomas to other cancers decreases with age. The most common NRSTS are undifferentiated pleomorphic sarcoma, synovial sarcoma, and malignant peripheral nerve sheath tumor.

== Classification ==
Sarcomas are malignant tumors formed by cells derived from mesenchymal stem cells. Mesenchymal stem cells give rise to a variety of cell types, and sarcomas can be classified based on the type of tissue making up the tumor. NRSTS are sarcomas whose tissue presents without features of either bone or skeletal muscle tissue:

- Sarcoma: tissue derived from mesenchyme
  - Bone sarcoma: bone tissue
  - Soft-tissue sarcoma: not bone tissue
    - Rhabdomyosarcoma: skeletal muscle tissue
    - Non-rhabdomyosarcoma soft tissue sarcoma: not skeletal muscle tissue

Since mesenchymal stem cells can differentiate into a large variety of cells, and since NRSTS encompass all sarcomas composed of neither bone nor skeletal muscle tissue, there are a large variety of NRSTS. There are over 50 histological subtypes of NRSTS. Below are examples of NRSTS presented within the 2020 WHO Classification of Tumors of Soft Tissue.

- Adipocytic tumors
  - Liposarcoma
    - Well differentiated liposarcoma: lipoma-like, sclerosing, inflammatory
    - Dedifferentiated liposarcoma
    - Myxoid liposarcoma
    - Pleomorphic liposarcoma (PLPS)
      - Epithelioid LPS (distinctive variant of PLPS)
    - Myxoid pleomorphic liposarcoma
- Fibroblastic/myofibroblastic tumors
  - Fibrosarcoma
    - Infantile fibrosarcoma
  - Myxofibrosarcoma
  - Low-grade myofibroblastic sarcoma
  - Sclerosing epithelioid fibrosarcoma
- Vascular tumors
  - Angiosarcoma
  - Kaposi sarcoma
- Smooth muscle tumors
  - Leiomyosarcoma
  - Inflammatory leiomyosarcoma
- Peripheral nerve sheath tumor
  - Malignant peripheral nerve sheath tumor
  - Melanotic malignant nerve sheath tumor
  - Granular cell tumor, malignant
  - Perineurioma, malignant
- Tumors of uncertain differentiation
  - Synovial sarcoma
  - Epithelioid sarcoma: proximal and classic variant
  - Alveolar soft part sarcoma
  - Clear cell sarcoma
  - Extraskeletal myxoid chondrosarcoma
  - Intimal sarcoma
  - Undifferentiated sarcoma
  - Undifferentiated spindle cell sarcoma
  - Undifferentiated pleomorphic sarcoma
  - Undifferentiated round cell sarcoma

== Symptoms ==
NRSTS most commonly present as a painless, enlarging mass in the trunk or extremities. Symptoms depend on the location of the tumor and its effect on nearby structures, potentially causing numbness, weakness, pain, swelling or organ dysfunction. If the NRSTS spreads then it can cause systemic symptoms.

== Diagnosis ==
The rarity and diversity of NRSTS impedes their diagnosis. Diagnosis requires a biopsy of the tumor to characterize the tumor cells and their molecular features (genetics, epigenetics, proteome, etc.). Radiological imaging (MRIs, X-rays, CT scans, etc.) can help locate or determine the extent of the NRSTS.

== Treatment ==
Surgery is the primary treatment for the majority of NRSTS, usually being the only treatment for resected (surgically removed), low-grade tumors. In other cases, radiation therapy with or without chemotherapy are considered. The majority of unresectable, localized NRSTS, become resectable following treatment with chemotherapy and/or radiation therapy.

Chemotherapy can be used on large, high-grade tumors to help prevent them from metastasizing—spreading throughout the body. If the NRSTS has spread then chemotherapy can also be used to aid with system-wide control of the cancer. Due to their diversity, NRSTS have more variable and unpredictable responsiveness to chemotherapy than rhabdomyosarcomas.
