= Rhabdomyoblast =

Cell type found in certain tumors (rhabdomyosarcomas)

A rhabdomyoblast is a cell type which is found in some rhabdomyosarcomas. When found histologically, a rhabdomyoblast aids the diagnosis of embryonal, alveolar, spindle cell/sclerosing, and pleomorphic rhabdomyosarcomas; however, in a tumor, expression of the rhabdomyoblast phenotype is not the only factor in diagnosing a rhabdomyosarcoma. Mesenchymal malignancies can exhibit this phenotype as well. Immunohistochemistry techniques allow for the sensitive detection of desmin, vimentin, muscle specific actin, and MyoD1. Similarly the rhabdomyoblast phenotype can be detected morphologically.

Rhabdomyoblasts are early stage mesenchymal cells, having the potential to differentiate into a wide range of skeletal cells. Each stage of differentiation exhibits unique and distinguishable histological characteristics. In its initial form, stellate cells with amphiphilic cytoplasm and ovular central nuclei are observed. Commonly referred to as rhabdoid features, the maturing rhabdomyoblast will likely exhibit low levels of eosinophilic cytoplasm in proximal distances to the nucleus. As maturation and differentiation progress, the cell's cytoplasmic levels of white blood cells increase; additionally, elongated shapes, commonly depicted as "tadpole", "strap" and "spider cells", are observed. In the concluding phase of differentiation, the white blood cell rich cytoplasm appears bright and exhibits cross-striation. The highly regulated organization of actin and myosin microfilaments in contractile proteins results in this appearance.

With advancements in the medical field, the number of tumors connected to the rhabdomyoblastic phenotype has increased. Recently, the lesion cells of 10 inflammatory tumors were found to possess the rhabdomyoblastic phenotype. Continued research is necessary for precise molecular characterization of the rhabdomyoblastic phenotype and its use in patient case management.

== Post-Treatment rhabdomyoblast emergence ==
Cancer encompasses the group of diseases classified by abnormal cell growth. While cases of cancer have increased, likely due to better methods of detection and potentially increased exposure to carcinogens, cancer has been present throughout human history. The earliest written acknowledgment of cancer took place in 1600 BC in Edwin Smith Papyrus, an ancient Egyptian medical treatise. The efficacy and availability of cancer treatments has tremendously improved since the disease's origin. Treatment options for various cancers consist of, but are not limited to, chemotherapy, radiation, and palliative care. The type of treatment used is determined by a combination of factors, including recommendations provided by health professionals, patient preferences, and biological properties of the cancer.

Following cancer treatment, specifically through chemotherapy and radiation, lesions composed almost exclusively of mature rhabdomyoblasts can emerge. This phenomenon, referred to as cytodifferention, in pediatric rhabdomyosarcoma has been accepted in the medical field for several decades. The increase of differentiated rhabdomyoblasts can be attributed to the degradation of undifferentiated tumor cells. In clinical settings, the emergence of post-chemotherapy rhabdomyoblast differentiation in cases of pediatric embryonal rhabdomyosarcoma is an encouraging prognosis, as it potentially signifies the tumor's increased response to the provided therapy. Outlier case reports have been presented, including the aggressive prognosis of embryonal rhabdomyosarcoma and the simultaneous development adipocyte-like cells. Other favorable prognosis factors following target therapies exist and may serve as a more reliable indicator until sufficient data regarding rhabdomyosarcoma cases are available. Medical professionals have suggested that well defined rhabdomyoblasts with a low mitotic index serve as a marker to terminate additional treatment regimens. The mitotic index of a sample can be calculated by summing the number of somatic cells in prophase, metaphase, anaphase, and telophase, then dividing by the total number of quantifiable somatic cells.

== Presence in pediatric neoplasms ==
Neoplasia, the formation of a neoplasm, can result in the expression of tumors and ultimately progress into cancers. The detection of rhabdomyoblasts is fundamental in the diagnosis of rhabdomyosarcomas, but rhabdomyoblast differentiation can be detected in several pediatric neoplasms. Rhabdomyoblastic differentiation is not a characteristic unique to rhabdomyosarcomas; in order for optimal treatment to be administered, the neoplasm containing rhabdomyoblasts should be carefully and correctly classified.

=== Rhabdomyosarcoma ===
Sarcomas are cancers that originate from connective tissues. Rhabdomyosarcoma is a sarcoma composed of skeletal muscle cells; irregular growth in the primitive form of these skeletal muscle cells, rhabdomyoblasts, are commonly associated with Rhabdomyosarcoma. Being the most common sarcoma among the childhood population, the level of rhabdomyoblast differentiation is variable between and within Rhabdomyosarcoma subtypes. The rhabdomyoblast displays only condensed eosinophilic cytoplasm at the undifferentiated state, but becomes more defined with increased differentiation. Variations in cytoplasmic shape range from stretched to polygonal. Immunochemistry is needed to prove the presence of rhabdomyoblast differentiation. Detection for MyoD1 and myogenin is used frequently. Staining sensitivity is highly variable from subtype to subtype. For instance the myogenin staining is far less efficient than Myod1 in the spindle cell rhabdomyosarcoma subtype. Variable levels of desmin are also reported among rhabdomyosarcomas.

It has previously been suggested that there are four subtypes of rhabdomyosarcoma. Recent studies have advocated for the emergence of three additional subtypes: those with Myod1 mutations, TFCP2 mutations, and VGLL2/NCOA2 fusions. In general, the severity of rhabdomyosarcomas vary based on the tumor location and other factors; the five year survival rates rang from 35% to 95%.

=== Rhadbodomyofibrosarcoma ===
Infantile rhadbodomyofibrosarcoma is an extremely rare sarcoma variant. Only being present in children under the age of three, the rare sarcoma shares many features with infantile fibrosarcoma. Concerns arise due the similarities between these two sarcomas; rhadbodomyofibrosarcomas have a more aggressive and costly prognosis than that of fibrosarcomas through distant metastasis and recurrence. There are troubling beliefs that rhadbodomyofibrosarcomas may be underdiagnosed, resulting in potential under treatment. Histologically, rhadbodomyofibrosarcomas display a wide variety of rhabdomyoblasts within spindle cell proliferation. These neoplastic cells yield positive results for vimentin, smooth muscle actin, and desmin stains; however, myoglobin, myoD1 and myogenin stains yield negative test results. Thus, the detection of rhabdomyoblasts can play a key role in distinguishing rhadbodomyofibrosarcomas from fibrosarcomas.

=== Peripheral nerve sheath tumors ===
Malignant peripheral nerve sheath tumors are aggressive soft tissue sarcomas occurring on the exterior lining of nerves. These nerves extend outward from the spinal cord to the rest of the body. Commonly, tumors develop promptly on extremities due to a mutation of the tumor suppressor, neurofibromin. These developments do not possess precise sub-cellular characteristics. Histological tests indicate epithelial and mesenchymal cell differentiation; neoplastic skeletal muscle displays rhabdomyoblasts during differentiation. A subcategory of malignant peripheral nerve sheath tumors in particular, malignant triton tumors, have an enhanced expression of rhabdomyoblast differentiation. Its name was coined due to the tumor's ability to promote the growth of limbs on the backs' of triton salamanders in animal transplant models. The quantity of rhabdomyoblasts present throughout the stroma is variable, with defining characteristics being eosinophilic rich cytoplasm and an unusual polygonal-like shape. Microscopically, the cytoplasmic content makes the rhabdomyoblast easily identifiable at low power due to its sharp contrast with the pale background of Schwannian cells. The severity and rapidness of progression in malignant triton tumors exceeds that of other malignant peripheral nerve sheath tumors; the short term survival rates of those with malignant triton tumors are significantly lower than the alternative. These more consequential prognoses can sometimes be detected through rhabdomyoblast characterization. The differentiation of rhabdomyoblasts in malignant triton tumors from that of rhabdomyosarcomas may be difficult; this difficulty can be further compounded by the association of patients with neurofibromatosis 1 and increased risk of rhadbodomyofibrosarcoma. The detection of benign nerve sheath tumors, a dense Schwannian cell background, negative test results for desmin, myogenin and MyoD1 are reliable indicators of a malignant triton tumor.

=== Ectomesenchymoma ===
Malignant ectomesenchymomas are rare sarcomas found in children; they contain neuroectodermal and mesenchymal neoplastic elements. The abnormal growth has an unusual prognosis, stemming from the developing neural crest tissue during embryogenesis. A finite number of malignant ectomesenchymoma cases have previously been reported, with the majority presenting in young males. Extensive research is needed for a more detailed report; however, embryonal rhabdomyosarcoma and rhabdomyoblast differentiation have been detected histologically. The development of malignant ectomesenchymomas are still not fully understood; it has been suggested, due to consistent genetic abnormalities, that the neoplasm may be a variant embryonal rhabdomyosarcoma.

=== Nephroblastoma ===
A 'nephroblastoma, also referred to as Wilms' tumor, arises from blastemal cells and induces abnormal cellular differentiation in children. The tumor is the most common pediatric genitourinary tumor, affecting approximately 1 in every 8,000-10,000 children. Upon examination, a solid mass with regions indicative of necrosis are typically seen. Some cases present a projection of the tumor into the renal pelvis. This progression suggests skeletal muscle differentiation, establishing differential diagnosis hardships with rhabdomyosarcoma. Various degrees of skeletal differentiation in the stroma are observed. Rhabdomyoblasts are observed in the most frequent divergent cell line. The rare deviation of Wilms' tumor, fetal rhabdomyomatous nephroblastoma, is composed predominantly of differentiating rhabdomyoblasts. This variant can also be identified by defined striations and central nuclei. Fetal rhabdomyomatous nephroblastoma is known to be unresponsive to chemotherapy; surgery has proven to be the optimal treatment method. For this reason, its identification is significant for proper patient treatment.

=== Pleuropulmonary blastoma ===
Pleuropulmonary blastoma development occurs in children; its presentation can occur via pulmonary or pleural based neoplasms. Clinically, its presence in children induces respiratory distress, a non-productive cough, fever, and chest pain. Three evolutions of pleuropulmonary blastomas are known and categorized based on prognostic elements. Type 1 pleuropulmonary blastomas are composed of purely cystic tumors. Type 1 pleuropulmonary blastomas have the potential to progress into type 2 and type 3, which consist of a mixture of cystic and solid tumors and purely solid tumors respectively. In the type 1 categorization, the exterior region of the cyst may contain rhabdomyoblastic differentiation in addition to the early stages of abnormal tissue growth. Type 2 and type 3 categorizations contain a blastematous and mesenchymal component. The mesenchymal portion may exhibit elongated rhabdomyoblasts in sheets or clusters; this appearance is a product of the common rhabdomyosarcomatous proliferation. Detection of these features can be confirmed with the use of immunochemistry.

=== Other head and neck malignancies ===
Rhabdomyoblastic differentiation has been detected in several other malignancies associated with the head and neck area. Additional malignancies include sarcomatoid carcinoma, undifferentiated (anaplastic) thyroid carcinoma, salivary carcinosarcoma, olfactory neuroblastoma, teratocarcinosarcoma, malignant teratoma, melanoma, liposarcoma and more. This identifies the potential for misdiagnosis, as rhabdomyoblastic differentiation is present in several neoplasms.
