= CKLF-like MARVEL transmembrane domain-containing 5 =

CKLF-like MARVEL transmembrane domain-containing 5 (CMTM5), previously termed chemokine-like factor superfamily 5 (i.e. CKLFSF5), designates any one of the six protein isoforms (termed CMTM5-v1 to CMTM5-v6) encoded by six different alternative splices of its gene, CMTM5; CMTM5-v1 is the most studied of these isoforms. The CMTM5 gene is located in band 11.2 on the long (i.e. "q") arm of chromosome 14.

The CMTM5 isoforms are members of the CKLF-like MARVEL transmembrane domain-containing family (CMTM). This family consists of 9 proteins although most of them are known to have one or more isoforms. These proteins are: chemokine-like factor (i.e. CLF, the founding member of the family) and CEF-like marvel transmembrane domain-containing 1 through 8 (i.e. CMTM1 through CMTM8). All of these proteins as well as the genes responsible for their production (i.e. CKLF and CMTM1 to CMTM8, respectively) have similar structures but vary in their apparent physiological and pathological functions. Preliminary studies suggest that CMTM5-v1 (which cells commonly secrete to the extracellular spaces such as the blood) or an unspecified CMTM5 isoform has various functions including involvements in regulating the autoimmune system, the development of numerous types of cancers, and the cardiovascular system.

== Autoimmune system ==
The methylation of certain CpG clusters (i.e. DNA areas high in cytosine and guanine) regulate the transcriptional activity of nearby genes. That is, the methylation of a cluster(s) regulates its nearby gene by blocking it from making mRNAs and thereby the proteins encoded by these mRNAs. Studies find that the CMTM5 gene in the DNA isolated from the blood of individuals with the autoimmune diseases of systemic lupus erythematosus and primary Sjögren's syndrome (i.e. Sjorgen's syndrome not associated with other health problems or connective tissue diseases) is hyper-methylated at its CpG cluster(s) and thereby less active or inactive. On the other hand, the CpG cluster(s) controlling the CMTM5 gene in the blood of individuals with the autoimmune disease of rheumatoid arthritis are hypo-methylated and therefore highly active. These methylation changes, the studies suggest, regulate the function of immunologically active blood cells (and, perhaps, blood platelets) and thereby the development, maintenance, and/or worsening of the cited autoimmune diseases. Further studies are required to prove that these methylations contribute to the immunologic dysregulations occurring in these (and perhaps other) autoimmune diseases and can serve as clinical markers of disease severity and/or as therapeutic targets for controlling the diseases.

== Cancers ==
Studies have reported that: 1) the levels of CMTM5-v1 in the malignant tissues of patients with prostate cancer are lower than the levels in their nearby normal prostate gland tissues as well as in the tissues of patients with benign prostate hyperplasia; 2) patients with lower prostate cancer tissue levels of CMTM5-v1 have higher prostate cancer Gleason scores and therefore poorer prognoses than patients with higher prostate cancer tissue levels of CMTM5-v1; and 3) the forced overexpression of CMTM5-v1 in cultured DU145 cells (a human prostate cancer cell line) reduces, while the forced higher expression of the CMTM5-v1 levels increases, their proliferation and migration. Similar findings for an unspecified CMTM5 isoform are reported in ovarian cancer, hepatocellular carcinoma, pancreatic cancer, non-small-cell lung carcinoma, renal cell carcinoma, and breast cancer. The forced over expression of CMTM5-v1 in Huh7 human hepatic cells also inhibited the ability of these cells to grow in a mouse model of cancer. Finally, various cancer human cell lines including those of the liver, breast, prostate, colon, stomach, nasopharynx, laryngopharynx, esophagus, lung, and cervix express low levels of, or no, CMTM5-v1 and concurrently have highly methylated CpG sites near to the CMTM5 gene. These findings suggest that the CMTM5 gene may act as a tumor suppressor gene, i.e. a normal gene whose product(s) inhibit the development and/or progression of various cancers. The findings also support further studies to confirm and expand these relationships and determine if the expression of CMTM5 isoforms can be used as tumor markers for these cancers severities/prognoses and/or targets as for treating them.

== Cardiovascular system ==
A case–control study of hospitalized patients found that the blood plasma levels of CMTM5 protein and CMTM5 messenger RNA (i.e. mRNA) in 350 patients with coronary artery disease were significantly higher than a matched group of 350 patients without this disease. The same research group similarly studied 124 hospitalized patients who had in place a coronary artery stent. They found that high blood plasma levels of CMTM5 mRNA were associated with a higher rate of subsequently developing stenosis (i.e. narrowing) in their stents than patients with lower levels of this mRNA. Furthermore, the forced overexpression of the CMTM5 gene inhibited the proliferation and migration of cultured human endothelial cells, while the forced suppression of the CMTM5 gene promote the proliferation of these cells. These studies suggest that the CMTM5 gene, one of its mRNAs, and/or one of its CMTM5 proteins may promote atherosclerosis-based coronary artery disease and the stenosis of coronary artery stents and do so by inhibiting vascular endothelial cells from functioning to inhibit atherosclerosis and stent occlusion. More studies are necessary to confirm and further define these relationships; to determine if expression of the CMTM5 gene's or its products can be used as makers for patient susceptibilities to coronary artery/stent occlusions; and to determine if this gene or its products can be used clinically as targets for preventing or decreasing the frequency of these occlusions.
