= ADP deaminase =

Class of enzymes

Identifiers
- EC no.: 3.5.4.7
- CAS no.: 9027-79-6

Databases
- BRENDA: enzyme data
- ExPASy: NiceZyme view
- KEGG: enzyme entry
- MetaCyc: metabolic pathway
- Rhea: reactions
- PDB structures: RCSB PDB PDBe PDBsum
- Gene Ontology: AmiGO / QuickGO
Search
- PMC: articles
- PubMed: articles
- NCBI: proteins

ADP deaminase (EC 3.5.4.7) is an enzyme first characterised from rabbit muscle that catalyzes the hydrolysis of adenosine diphosphate (ADP) to inosine diphosphate and ammonia as part of the metabolism of purine nucleotides:

adenosine diphosphate
H_{2}O
NH_{3}
inosine diphosphate

The reaction has been used in an assay for ADP.

This enzyme is a hydrolase, one acting on carbon-nitrogen bonds other than peptide bonds, specifically in cyclic amidines. The systematic name of this enzyme class is ADP aminohydrolase. Other names in common use include adenosine diphosphate deaminase, and adenosinepyrophosphate deaminase.

== Isozymes ==
This type of enzyme activity was reported in rabbits and certain fungi (aspergillus) in two papers from 1967 and 1968, but currently no identified proteins of this type are listed in databases like uniprot/expasy.

== See also ==
- AMP deaminase which hydrolyses adenosine monophosphate to inosine monophosphate
