= Histiocytoma =

Tumour consisting of histiocytes

- Specialty: Oncology

A histiocytoma is a tumour consisting of histiocytes. Histiocytes are cells that are a part of the mononuclear phagocytic system, a part of the body's immune system that consists of phagocytic cells, which are responsible for engulfing solid particles by the cell membrane to form an internal phagosome by phagocytes and protists. Myxofibrosarcoma had been classified as a type of histiocytoma. However, the World Health Organization (2020) reclassified myxofibrosarcoma as a malignant tumor in the category of fibroblastic/myofibroblastic tumors.

Types include:

- benign fibrous histiocytoma: This tumor has also been termed benign fibrous histiocytomas of the skin, superficial/cutaneous benign fibrous histiocytomas, common fibrous histiocytoma, and more recently dermatofibroma. The use of "histiocytoma" in these terms refers more to the morphologic appearance of some of the cells that comprise these lesions rather than their lineage: studies to date have not fully determined the lineage of the neoplastic cells in dermatofibroma tumors but recent cell marker studies suggest these cells originate from fibroblasts rather than histiocytes.
- malignant fibrous histiocytoma: This tumor is now termed undifferentiated pleomorphic sarcoma (UPS) because more recently developed immunohistochemistry and cytogenetic analyses suggest that its neoplastic cells most likely arise from mesenchymal stem cells or fibroblasts rather than histiocytes.
- histiocytoma (dog)
