= CKLF like MARVEL transmembrane domain containing 6 =

Transmembrane protein

CMTM6

Identifiers
- Aliases: CMTM6, CKLFSF6, PRO2219, CKLF like MARVEL transmembrane domain containing 6, ayoube, gourari
- External IDs: OMIM: 607889; MGI: 2447165; GeneCards: CMTM6

Gene location (Human)
Chr.	Chromosome 3 (human)
Band	3p22.3	Start	32,481,312 bp
Band	3p22.3	End	32,502,852 bp

Gene location (Mouse)
Chr.	Chromosome 9 (mouse)
Band	9|9 F3	Start	114,560,184 bp
Band	9|9 F3	End	114,578,412 bp
RNA expression pattern
Bgee	Human / Mouse (ortholog); Top expressed in: bronchial epithelial cell; trabecular bone; skin of thigh; mucosa of paranasal sinus; nipple; mononuclear cell; monocyte; secondary oocyte; lactiferous duct; epithelium of nasopharynx / Top expressed in: granulocyte; right kidney; submandibular gland; proximal tubule; human kidney; stroma of bone marrow; Paneth cell; external carotid artery; blood; jejunum; More reference expression data
BioGPS	n/a
Gene ontology
Molecular function	cytokine activity; protein binding
Cellular component	extracellular exosome; membrane; extracellular space; plasma membrane; integral component of membrane; azurophil granule membrane; specific granule membrane; endosome; early endosome membrane; recycling endosome membrane
Biological process	chemotaxis; neutrophil degranulation; regulation of signaling receptor activity; protein transport; regulation of protein stability; endocytic recycling
Sources:Amigo / QuickGO
Orthologs
Databases	NCBI: entry; OMA: entry
Species	Human	Mouse
Entrez	54918	67213
Ensembl	ENSG00000091317	ENSMUSG00000032434
UniProt	Q9NX76	Q9CZ69
RefSeq (mRNA)	NM_017801	NM_026036
RefSeq (protein)	NP_060271	NP_080312
Location (UCSC)	Chr 3: 32.48 – 32.5 Mb	Chr 9: 114.56 – 114.58 Mb
PubMed search
- Wikidata
View/Edit Human	View/Edit Mouse

CKLF like MARVEL transmembrane domain-containing 6 (i.e. CMTM6), previously termed chemokine-like factor superfamily 6 (i.e. CKLFSF6), is a transmembrane protein encoded in humans by the CMTM6 gene (also termed the CKLFSF6, PRO2219, ayoube, or gourari gene). This gene is located in band 22.3 on the short (or "p") arm of chromosome 3. CMTM6 protein belongs to the CKLF-like MARVEL transmembrane domain-containing family of proteins. This family consist of 9 member proteins: CKLF and CMTM1 through CMTM8. The CMTM family proteins are involved in autoimmune diseases, cardiovascular diseases, the male reproductive system, haematopoiesis, and cancer development. CMTM6 protein regulates immune responses to normal and abnormal (particularly cancerous) cells.

== Structure and locations ==
Like the other members in the CMTM protein family, CMTM6 has a structure that contains domains (i.e. parts) similar to those in chemokine proteins; tetraspanin proteins (also termed transmembrane-4 superfamily proteins); the myelin and lymphocyte protein (also termed MAR protein); proteins that direct membrane vesicle trafficking; and proteins that are embedded across cell membranes. CMTM6 proteins are expressed in virtually all tissues and are located in cell plasma membranes (i.e. cell surface membranes), lysosomes, endosomes, cytosol, attached to the cell's cytoskeleton, and in extracellular spaces.

== Functions and actions ==
CMTM6 localizes with and binds to cell PD-L1 protein located on cell surface membranes thereby maintaining PD-L1'S expression at this site; it also localizes with PD-L1 protein located in recycling endosomes and thereby prevents PD-L1 from being degraded by lysosomal enzymes. These actions increase and maintain high levels of PD-L1 on cell surface membranes. PD-L1 protein on the surface of normal cells binds to PD-1 receptors on a type of cytotoxic T cells (i.e. CD8+ T cells) and thereby blocks these T-cells from organizing an immune response that would kill them. This PD-L1/CD8+ T cell circuit is one of several immune checkpoint mechanisms for maintaining self-tolerance, i.e. for preventing CD8+ T cells from attacking normal cells. Tumor cells may employ this immune-evading tactic: they may express PD-L1 and thereby block CD8+ T cell-mediated immune responses to themselves. In effect, the robust expression of PD-L1 helps not only normal cells but also cancer cells to evade immune destruction.

== Therapeutic inhibition of CMTM6's actions ==
Various manufactured therapeutic monoclonal antibody drugs, e.g. pembrolizumab, atezolizumab, durvalumab nivolumab, and avelumab, bind to and inhibit the stimulation of PD-1 on CD8+ T cells by PD-L1. In effect, they block the ability of CMTMT6 to suppress PDL1/PD-1-stimulated CD8+ T-cell immune responses against tumor cells. One or more of these drugs are approved by the FDA for treating (as a single agent or in combination with adjuvant radiotherapy and/or chemotherapy) various cancers including certain types of Hodgkin's disease, melanomas, Merkel-cell carcinomas, cancers associated with microsatellite instability (e.g. certain types of colon, stomach, endometrial, ovarian, hepatobiliary tract, urinary tract, brain, and skin cancers), non-small cell lung cancer, head and neck cancers, esophageal cancers, bladder cancers, urinary track cancers, renal cell cancers, hepatocellular carcinomas, triple-negative breast cancers, undifferentiated pleomorphic sarcomas, and some forms of soft tissue sarcomas that have metastasized. A phase II study of 56 patients with cancer of unknown primary origin, i.e. a very common (2% to 5% of all diagnosed cancers) and difficult to treat metastatic cancer in which the primary cancer is unknown) found that nivolumab had a small (overall complete plus partial response rate of ~20%) beneficial effect. However, the use of any of these monoclonal antibody drugs as a single immunotherapy agent often benefits only a small percentage of cases with a particular disease, often lasts for only a short time, and may cause severe side-effects. Consequently, alternate methods of using these anti-PD-1 antibodies are being studied. Current preclinical studies and clinical trials are testing combinations of two anti-PD-1 antibodies or one anti-PD-1 antibody combined with an antibody that binds to and inhibits other immune response-regulating proteins, e.g. the CTLA4 protein (i.e. cytotoxic T-lymphocyte-associated protein 4), for their therapeutic effects in the just cited and other cancer types.
