= AMP deaminase 1 =

Enzyme found in humans

AMPD1

Identifiers
- Aliases: AMPD1, MAD, MADA, MMDD, adenosine monophosphate deaminase 1, AMP deaminase, AMPD
- External IDs: OMIM: 102770; MGI: 88015; GeneCards: AMPD1
Enzyme activity
EC #	BRENDA	ExPASy	KEGG	MetaCyc
3.5.4.6	↗	↗	↗	↗

Gene location (Human)
Chr.	Chromosome 1 (human)
Band	1p13.2	Start	114,673,090 bp
Band	1p13.2	End	114,695,618 bp

Gene location (Mouse)
Chr.	Chromosome 3 (mouse)
Band	3 F2.2|3 45.25 cM	Start	102,981,330 bp
Band	3 F2.2|3 45.25 cM	End	103,007,036 bp
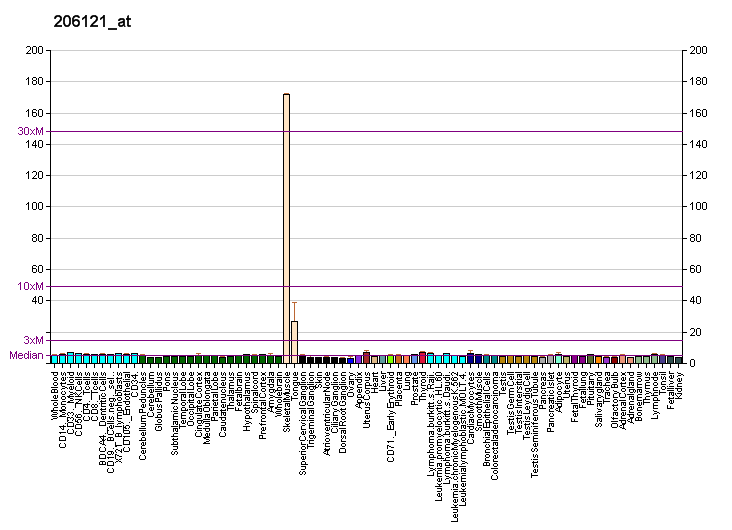
RNA expression pattern
Bgee	Human / Mouse (ortholog); Top expressed in: triceps brachii muscle; vastus lateralis muscle; Skeletal muscle tissue of rectus abdominis; biceps brachii; glutes; Skeletal muscle tissue of biceps brachii; muscle of thigh; thoracic diaphragm; deltoid muscle; gastrocnemius muscle / Top expressed in: quadriceps femoris muscle; muscle of thigh; skeletal muscle tissue; zone of skin; esophagus; lip; thymus; embryo; zygote; blastocyst; More reference expression data
BioGPS	More reference expression data
Gene ontology
Molecular function	hydrolase activity; myosin heavy chain binding; metal ion binding; deaminase activity; AMP deaminase activity
Cellular component	cytosol
Biological process	response to organic substance; IMP salvage; nucleotide metabolic process; purine-containing compound salvage; purine ribonucleoside monophosphate biosynthetic process; IMP biosynthetic process; AMP metabolic process
Sources:Amigo / QuickGO
Orthologs
Databases	NCBI: entry; OMA: entry
Species	Human	Mouse
Entrez	270	229665
Ensembl	ENSG00000116748	ENSMUSG00000070385
UniProt	P23109	Q3V1D3
RefSeq (mRNA)	NM_001172626; NM_000036	NM_001033303
RefSeq (protein)	NP_000027; NP_001166097	NP_001028475
Location (UCSC)	Chr 1: 114.67 – 114.7 Mb	Chr 3: 102.98 – 103.01 Mb
PubMed search
- Wikidata
View/Edit Human	View/Edit Mouse

AMP deaminase 1 is an enzyme that in humans is encoded by the AMPD1 gene (previously AMPD). It converts adenosine monophosphate (AMP) to inosinic acid and ammonia:

adenosine monophosphate
H_{2}O
NH_{3}
inosinic acid

== Function ==
Adenosine monophosphate deaminase 1 catalyzes the deamination of AMP to inosinic acid in skeletal muscle and plays an important role in the purine nucleotide cycle. AMPD1 is apparently a common cause of exercise-induced myopathy and probably the most common cause of metabolic myopathy in the human.

A research report shows that the widely prescribed diabetes medication metformin works on AMP-activated kinase (AMPK) by directly inhibiting AMP deaminase, thereby increasing cellular AMP.

== AMP deaminases ==
Enzymes that catalyze the deamination of AMP to inosinic acid are called AMP deaminases (EC 3.5.4.6). In humans, AMPD1 encodes the skeletal muscle isozyme, while two other genes have been identified, AMPD2 and AMPD3, for the liver- and erythrocyte-specific isoforms, respectively.

== Regulation ==
It has been shown that in environments with high potassium concentrations, AMP-deaminase is regulated by ATP and ADP through a "K_{m}-type" mechanism. In low potassium ion concentrations, a mixed "K_{m} V-type" of the regulation is observed.

== Pathology ==
AMPD1 deficiency, also known as myoadenylate deaminase deficiency, is a disorder in which the body produces insufficient AMP deaminase.
