= CKLF like MARVEL transmembrane domain-containing 1 =

CKLF like MARVEL transmembrane domain-containing 1 (i.e. CMTM1), formerly termed chemokine-like factor superfamily 1 (i.e. CKLFSF1), has 23 known isoforms, the CMTM1-v1 to CMTM1-v23 proteins. Protein isoforms are variant products that are made by alternative splicing of a single gene. The gene for these isoforms, CMTM1 (formerly termed CKLFSF1), is located in band 22 on the long (i.e. "q") arm of chromosome 16. The CMTM1 gene and its 23 isoforms belong to the CKLF-like MARVEL transmembrane domain-containing family of structurally and functionally related genes and proteins. CMTM1 (isoforms not specified) proteins are weakly express in a wide range of normal tissues but are far more highly expressed in normal testes as well as the malignant cells of certain types of cancer.

Studies have reported that the levels of CMTM1 (typically the CMTM1–v17 isoform) are more highly expressed in breast, kidney, lung, ovary, liver (i.e. hepatocellular carcinoma), and salivary gland adenoid cystic carcinoma malignant tissues than the nearby normal tissues of these respective organs. According to the Human Protein Atlas, higher levels of CMTM1 expression in hepatocellular carcinoma tissues are associated with shorter survival times. Another study found that the levels of CMTM1 mRNA (which directs the production of CMTM1 protein) were higher in stomach cancer compared to nearby normal stomach tissues. And, studies of glioblastoma found no significant difference between the levels of CMTM1 in this brain tumor's tissues versus nearby normal brain tissues but higher levels of tumor tissue CMTM1 were associated with poorer prognoses. In addition, the forced overexpression of CMTM1 in cultured glioblastoma cell lines increased their proliferation and invasiveness. These findings suggest that CMTM1 proteins may act to promote the cited cancers and support further studies to determine if these proteins contribute to the development and/or progression of the cited cancers, can be used as markers of disease severity and/or prognosis, or are targets for treating these cancers.

In contrast to the findings in the cancers just cited, cell culture studies indicated that the forced overexpression of the CMTM1-v5 isoform induced apoptosis (i.e. cell death due to the activation of cell death-inducing signaling pathways) in two types of lymphoma cell lines, Jurkat cells (a human T cell leukemia cell line) and Raji cells (a human non-Hodgkin's lymphoma cell line). Simple addition of CMTM1-v5 protein to cultures of Daudi or Ramos cells (both are Burkitt's lymphoma cell lines) or Jurkat cells likewise caused these cells to become apoptotic. Various other cultured hematological tumor cell lines had no such response to the CMTM1-v5 protein. Finally, the injection of CMTM1-v5 into mice containing Raji cell tumors in a xenotransplantation model of cancer inhibited the spread of these tumors and prolonged the survival of the mice. These findings suggest that CMTM1-v5 protein may act to suppress certain types of lymphoma in humans and support initial studies to define the CMTM1-v5 levels in the malignant cells of humans with these lymphomas. Further studies are also needed to determine the basis for the CMTM1 proteins' promoting actions in the cited cancers versus suppressing actions in the cited lymphomas.
