= AMP deaminase 3 =

Protein-coding gene in the species Homo sapiens

AMPD3

Identifiers
- Aliases: AMPD3, adenosine monophosphate deaminase 3
- External IDs: OMIM: 102772; MGI: 1096344; GeneCards: AMPD3
Enzyme activity
EC #	BRENDA	ExPASy	KEGG	MetaCyc
3.5.4.6	↗	↗	↗	↗

Gene location (Human)
Chr.	Chromosome 11 (human)
Band	11p15.4	Start	10,308,313 bp
Band	11p15.4	End	10,507,579 bp

Gene location (Mouse)
Chr.	Chromosome 7 (mouse)
Band	7 E3|7 57.85 cM	Start	110,367,413 bp
Band	7 E3|7 57.85 cM	End	110,411,612 bp
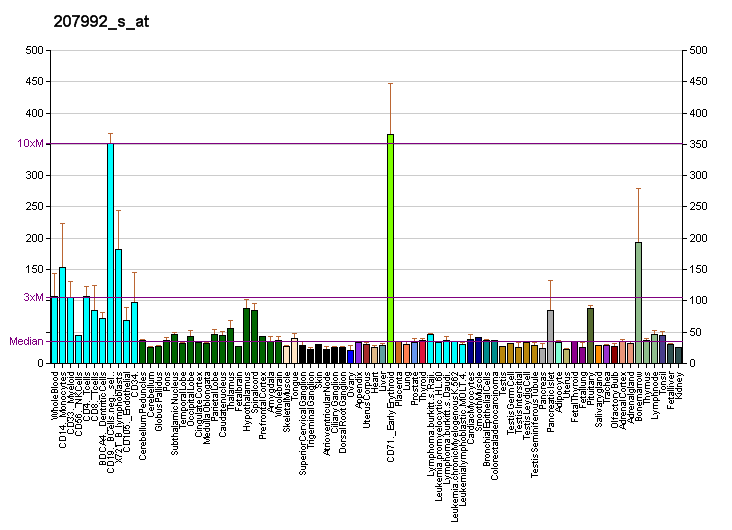

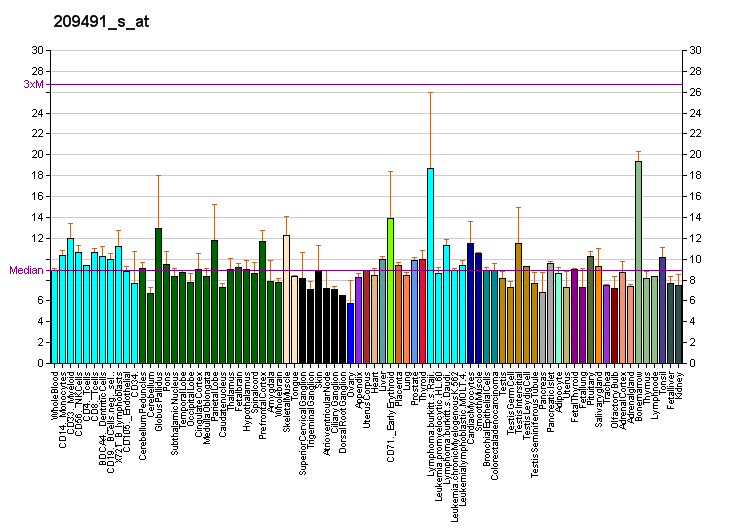
RNA expression pattern
Bgee	Human / Mouse (ortholog); Top expressed in: glutes; dorsal motor nucleus of vagus nerve; tibialis anterior muscle; cartilage tissue; inferior olivary nucleus; secondary oocyte; trabecular bone; right uterine tube; bone marrow; inferior ganglion of vagus nerve / Top expressed in: decidua; gastrula; granulocyte; umbilical cord; stroma of bone marrow; seminal vesicula; cervix; myocardium of ventricle; secondary oocyte; primary oocyte; More reference expression data
BioGPS	More reference expression data
Gene ontology
Molecular function	hydrolase activity; metal ion binding; deaminase activity; AMP deaminase activity; protein binding
Cellular component	cytosol; extracellular region; secretory granule lumen; ficolin-1-rich granule lumen
Biological process	GTP metabolic process; purine ribonucleoside monophosphate biosynthetic process; erythrocyte homeostasis; nucleotide metabolic process; AMP metabolic process; ADP metabolic process; purine-containing compound salvage; IMP salvage; energy homeostasis; ATP metabolic process; AMP catabolic process; IMP biosynthetic process; neutrophil degranulation
Sources:Amigo / QuickGO
Orthologs
Databases	NCBI: entry; OMA: entry
Species	Human	Mouse
Entrez	272	11717
Ensembl	ENSG00000133805	ENSMUSG00000005686
UniProt	Q01432	O08739
RefSeq (mRNA)	NM_001172431; NM_000480; NM_001025389; NM_001025390; NM_001172430	NM_001276301; NM_009667; NM_001372439; NM_001372441
RefSeq (protein)	NP_000471; NP_001020560; NP_001020561; NP_001165901; NP_001165902	NP_001263230; NP_033797; NP_001359368; NP_001359370
Location (UCSC)	Chr 11: 10.31 – 10.51 Mb	Chr 7: 110.37 – 110.41 Mb
PubMed search
- Wikidata
View/Edit Human	View/Edit Mouse

AMP deaminase 3 is an enzyme that in humans is encoded by the AMPD3 gene.

This gene encodes a member of the AMP deaminase gene family. The encoded protein is a highly regulated enzyme that catalyzes the hydrolytic deamination of adenosine monophosphate to inosine monophosphate, a branch point in the adenylate catabolic pathway. This gene encodes the erythrocyte (E) isoforms, whereas other family members encode isoforms that predominate in muscle (M) and liver (L) cells. Mutations in this gene lead to the clinically asymptomatic, autosomal recessive condition erythrocyte AMP deaminase deficiency. Alternatively spliced transcript variants encoding different isoforms of this gene have been described.
