= CKLF like MARVEL transmembrane domain-containing 8 =

CKLF like MARVEL transmembrane domain-containing 8 (i.e. CMTM8), previously termed chemokine-like factor superfamily 8 (i.e. CKLFSF8) has at least two isoforms, the CMTM8 and CMTM8-v2 proteins. Protein isoforms are variant products that are made by the alternative splicing of a single gene. The gene for these isoforms, CMTM8 (formerly termed CKLFSF8), is located in band 22 on the short (i.e. "p") arm of chromosome 3. The CMTM8 gene and its CMTM8 and CMTM8-v2 proteins belong to the CKLF-like MARVEL transmembrane domain-containing family of structurally and functionally related genes and proteins. The CMTM8 protein is the full-length and predominant product of the CMTM8 gene. This protein is expressed in a wide range of normal adult and fetal tissues while relatively little is known about the CMTM8-v2 protein. Studies suggest that the CMTM8 protein may be involved in the development of various cancers.

The levels of CMTM8 protein are lower in the tissues of non-small-cell lung carcinoma, colon cancer, rectal cancer, esophageal cancer, bladder cancer, stomach cancer, and glioblastoma brain tumors than in their respective adjacent normal organ tissues. The low levels of CMTM8 protein in bladder and stomach cancer tissues were associated with more aggressive diseases (e.g. presence of metastases) and poorer prognoses. These findings suggest that CMTM8 protein may inhibit the development and/or progression of the cited malignancies and therefore the CMTM8 gene functions as a tumor suppressor gene. However, further studies are required to support these conclusions and to determine if the levels of CMTM8 protein can be used as prognostic markers for these malignancies and/or as a targets for treating them.
