= CKLF like MARVEL transmembrane domain containing 7 =

Mammalian protein found in humans

CMTM7

Identifiers
- Aliases: CMTM7, CKLFSF7, CKLF like MARVEL transmembrane domain containing 7
- External IDs: OMIM: 607890; MGI: 2447166; HomoloGene: 15882; GeneCards: CMTM7; OMA:CMTM7 - orthologs

Gene location (Human)
Chr.	Chromosome 3 (human)
Band	3p22.3	Start	32,391,698 bp
Band	3p22.3	End	32,483,067 bp

Gene location (Mouse)
Chr.	Chromosome 9 (mouse)
Band	9|9 F3	Start	114,585,904 bp
Band	9|9 F3	End	114,610,924 bp
RNA expression pattern
Bgee	Human / Mouse (ortholog); Top expressed in: granulocyte; blood; pancreatic epithelial cell; spleen; mucosa of ileum; right lung; monocyte; right uterine tube; bone marrow; upper lobe of left lung / Top expressed in: granulocyte; thymus; bone marrow; tibiofemoral joint; stroma of bone marrow; dermis; blastocyst; external carotid artery; yolk sac; ankle joint; More reference expression data
BioGPS	n/a
Gene ontology
Molecular function	cytokine activity
Cellular component	membrane; extracellular space; integral component of membrane
Biological process	chemotaxis; B-1a B cell differentiation; regulation of signaling receptor activity; signal transduction
Sources:Amigo / QuickGO
Orthologs
Species	Human	Mouse
Entrez	112616	102545
Ensembl	ENSG00000153551	ENSMUSG00000032436
UniProt	Q96FZ5	Q9ESD6
RefSeq (mRNA)	NM_138410; NM_181472	NM_001252479; NM_133978
RefSeq (protein)	NP_612419; NP_852137	NP_001239408; NP_598739
Location (UCSC)	Chr 3: 32.39 – 32.48 Mb	Chr 9: 114.59 – 114.61 Mb
PubMed search
- Wikidata
View/Edit Human	View/Edit Mouse

CKLF like MARVEL transmembrane domain-containing 7 (i.e. CMTM7), previously termed chemokine-like factor superfamily 7 (i.e. CKLFSF7), is a protein that in humans is encoded by the CMTM7 gene. This gene, which is located in band 22 on the short (i.e. "p") arm of chromosome 3, and the protein that it encodes belong to the CKLF-like MARVEL transmembrane domain-containing family. Through the process of alternative splicing, the CMTM7 gene encodes two isoforms, CMTM7-v1 and CMTM7-v2, with CMTM7-v1 being the main form expressed and studied. CMTM7 proteins are widely expressed in normal human tissues.

== Function ==
CMTM7 protein levels are low in the malignant tissues of various cancers such as those of esophagus, stomach, pancreas, liver, lung, cervix, and breast. as compared with its expression in the normal tissues of these organs. Furthermore, the forced overexpression of CMTM7 protein in various cancer immortalized cell lines inhibit their proliferation and motility in culture as well as their ability to form tumors in a nude mouse experimental model of cancer. These findings suggest that the CMTM7 protein acts to inhibit the development and/or progression of these cancers and therefore that the CMTM7 gene acts as tumor suppressor in these cancers. However, further studies are needed to support these suggestion and determine if expression of the CMTM7 can be used as a clinical marker of these cancers severity/prognosis and/or as therapeutic targets for treating them.
