= CKLF-like MARVEL transmembrane domain-containing family =

The CKLF-like MARVEL transmembrane domain-containing family (CMTM), previously termed the chemokine-like factor superfamily (CKLFSF), consists of 9 proteins, some of which have various isoforms due to alternative splicing of their respective genes. These proteins along with their isoforms are:

- Chemokine-like factor (CKLF), the founding member of this family, has 4 known isoforms, CKLF1 to CKLF4.
- CKLF like MARVEL transmembrane domain-containing 1 (CMTM1) has 23 known isoforms, CMTM1-v1 to CMTM1-v23.
- CKLF like MARVEL transmembrane domain-containing 2 (CMTM2) has no known isoforms.
- CKLF like MARVEL transmembrane domain-containing 3 (CMTM3) has no known isoforms.
- CKLF like MARVEL transmembrane domain-containing 4 (CMTM4) has 3 known isoforms, CMTM4-v1 to CMTM4-v3.
- CKLF-like MARVEL transmembrane domain-containing 5 (CMTM5) has 6 known isoforms, CMTM5-v1 to CMTM5-v6.
- CKLF like MARVEL transmembrane domain containing 6 (CMTM6) has no known isoforms.
- CKLF like MARVEL transmembrane domain containing 7 (CMTM7) has 2 isoforms, CMTM7-v1 and CMTM7-v2.
- CKLF like MARVEL transmembrane domain-containing 8 (CMTM8) has two isoforms, CMTM8 and CMTM8-v2 (Little is known about the CMTM8-v2 isoform and the CMTM8 isoform is referred to as CMTM8 rather than CMTM8-v1.).

All of these proteins have domains (i.e. regions) similar to analogous domains in the chemokine proteins; tetraspanin proteins (also termed transmembrane-4 superfamily proteins); myelin and lymphocyte protein (also termed MAR protein); proteins that direct membrane vesicle trafficking; and other proteins that are embedded in cell membranes. The genes encoding (i.e. directing the production of) these proteins, CKLF, CMTM1, CMTM2, CMTM3, CMTM4, CMTM5, CMTM6, CMTM7, and CMTM8, respectively, also share similar regions that encode the domains just cited for their proteins. (The 8 CMTM genes were formerly termed CKLFSF1, CKLFSF2, CKLFSF3, CKLFSF4, CKLFSF5, CKLFSF6, CKLFSF7, and CKLFSF8.) The CKLF, CMTM1, CMTM2, CTMT3, and CMTM4 genes cluster together in band 22 on the long (i.e. "q") arm of chromosome 16; the CMTM6, CMTM7, and CMTM8 genes form a second cluster in band 22 on the short (i.e. "p") of chromosome 3; and the CMTM5 gene, located in band 11.2 on the q arm of chromosome 14, is not clustered with the other CMTM genes. These structural similarities and clusterings reflect the close relationships of these proteins and genes. Studies suggest that the members of this family may be involved in the development of various cancers autoimmune diseases, cardiovascular diseases, the male reproductive system, and angiogenesis (i.e. development of new blood vessels from pre-existing blood vessels). In most of these cases, however, further studies are needed to determine if these CMTM proteins and/or their corresponding genes and mRNAs will be promising targets to help in the diagnosis, prognosis, and/or treatment of these disorders.
