= Malignant triton tumor =

Malignant triton tumor (MTT) is a relatively rare, aggressive tumor made up of both malignant schwannoma cells and malignant rhabdomyoblasts. It is classified as a malignant peripheral nerve sheath tumor with rhabdomyosarcomatous differentiation.

The unusual name "triton" was first used in reference to observation of supernumerary limbs containing bone and muscle growing on the backs of triton salamanders after the implantation of sciatic nerve tissue.

== Diagnosis ==
There are three diagnostic criteria proposed:

1. The tumor arises along a peripheral nerve, or in a ganglioneuroma, or in a patient with neurofibromatosis type 1 (NF1), or has a metastatic character.
2. The growth characteristics of the tumor is typical for a Schwann cell tumor.
3. Rhabdomyoblasts arise within the body of the tumor.

== Bibliography ==
- Stasik CJ, Tawfik; Tawfik, O (2006). "Malignant peripheral nerve sheath tumor with rhabdomyosarcomatous differentiation (malignant triton tumor)". Arch Pathol Lab Med. 130 (12): 1878–81. doi:10.5858/2006-130-1878-MPNSTW. PMID 17149968.
