= CMTM3 =

Protein-coding gene in the species Homo sapiens

Identifiers
- Aliases: CMTM3, BNAS2, CKLFSF3, CKLF like MARVEL transmembrane domain containing 3
- External IDs: OMIM: 607886; MGI: 2447162; GeneCards: CMTM3

Gene location (Human)
Chr.	Chromosome 16 (human)
Band	16q22.1	Start	66,603,874 bp
Band	16q22.1	End	66,613,892 bp

Gene location (Mouse)
Chr.	Chromosome 8 (mouse)
Band	8|8 D3	Start	104,339,410 bp
Band	8|8 D3	End	104,347,672 bp
RNA expression pattern
Bgee	Human / Mouse (ortholog); Top expressed in: granulocyte; monocyte; right testis; stromal cell of endometrium; left testis; gallbladder; blood; right lung; canal of the cervix; decidua / Top expressed in: decidua; efferent ductule; dermis; vas deferens; stroma of bone marrow; calvaria; Gonadal ridge; uterus; atrium; migratory enteric neural crest cell; More reference expression data
BioGPS	n/a
Gene ontology
Molecular function	cytokine activity; protein binding
Cellular component	cytoplasm; nuclear membrane; membrane; extracellular space; integral component of membrane
Biological process	chemotaxis; positive regulation of B cell receptor signaling pathway; regulation of signaling receptor activity; blastocyst hatching; signal transduction
Sources:Amigo / QuickGO
Orthologs
Databases	NCBI: entry; OMA: entry
Species	Human	Mouse
Entrez	123920	68119
Ensembl	ENSG00000140931	ENSMUSG00000031875
UniProt	Q96MX0	Q99LJ5
RefSeq (mRNA)	NM_001048251; NM_144601; NM_181553; NM_181554; NM_181555 NM_001363918; NM_001363923	NM_024217
RefSeq (protein)	NP_653202; NP_853531; NP_001350847; NP_001350852	NP_077179
Location (UCSC)	Chr 16: 66.6 – 66.61 Mb	Chr 8: 104.34 – 104.35 Mb
PubMed search
- Wikidata
View/Edit Human	View/Edit Mouse

CKLF-like MARVEL transmembrane domain-containing protein 3 (i.e. CMTM3), also termed chemokine-like factor superfamily 3 (i.e. CKLFSF3), is a member of the CKLF-like MARVEL transmembrane domain-containing family (i.e. CMTM) of proteins. In humans, CMTM2 protein is encoded by the CMTM3 gene located in band 22.1 on the long (i.e. "q") arm of chromosome 16. This protein is expressed in a wide range of tissues, including fetal tissues. It is highly expressed in the male reproductive system, particularly testicular tissues and may play a role in the development of this tissue. It is also highly expressed in the immune system including circulating blood cells, i.e. B lymphocytes, CD4+ T lymphocytes, and monocytes. However, CMTM3 protein is weakly expressed or unexpressed in the malignant tissues of several types of cancers. In many but not all of theses cancers, this decreased or lack of expression appears due to methylation of the GpC islands in the promoter region, and thereby the silencing, of the CMTM3 gene.

Studies of CMTM3 protein levels in normal versus malignant tissues found that the malignant tissue levels of several types of cancer were lower, in a variable percentage of cases, than the levels in the normal tissues as well as the cases with high CMTM2 levels in the same cancer type. These cancers included those of the stomach, breast, nasopharynx (e.g. oral squamous cell carcinoma), male larynx, esophagus, prostate gland, colon, and kidney (i.e. the kidney clear-cell type). Moreover, low cancer tissue levels of CTMT3 protein were found to be associated with poorer prognoses compared to cases with higher levels of this protein in cancers of the stomach, esophagus, nasopharynx (i.e. oral squamous cell carcinoma type), and prostate gland. These finding suggest that the CMTM3 protein may act to suppress the development and/or progression of these cancers. Further studies are needed to support this suggestion and determine if CMTM3 protein can be a useful clinical marker to predict the severity of these cancers and/or serve as a therapeutic target for treating them.

Contrastingly, other studies have reported that: 1) CMTM3 protein promoted the proliferation of cultured glioblastoma immortalized cells; 2) high levels of CMTM3 protein were associated with shorter survival times in individuals with glioblastomas and gastric cancer; 3) analyses of 178 patients with pancreatic cancer found that their tumor tissues had higher CMTM3 protein levels than normal nearby pancreas tissues; and 4) patients with high levels of CMTM3 protein in their pancreatic cancer tissues had poorer prognoses and overall survival rates compared to patients with lower CMTM3 levels in their pancreatic cancer tissues. These findings suggest that CMTM3 acts to promote the development and/or progression of these three cancer types. They support further studies to confirm this suggestion, to determine if CMTM3 can be use as a prognostic indicator and a clinical therapeutic target for these three cancer types. Further investigations into the mechanisms behind the apparent ability of CMTM3 to suppress or promote these cancers are also needed.
