= CMTM2 =

Protein-coding gene in the species Homo sapiens

Identifiers
- Aliases: CMTM2, CKLFSF2, CKLF like MARVEL transmembrane domain containing 2
- External IDs: OMIM: 607885; MGI: 2447311; GeneCards: CMTM2

Gene location (Human)
Chr.	Chromosome 16 (human)
Band	16q21	Start	66,579,448 bp
Band	16q21	End	66,588,275 bp

Gene location (Mouse)
Chr.	Chromosome 8 (mouse)
Band	8|8 D3	Start	105,048,862 bp
Band	8|8 D3	End	105,057,396 bp
RNA expression pattern
Bgee	Human / Mouse (ortholog); Top expressed in: sperm; left testis; right testis; blood; testicle; granulocyte; trabecular bone; bone marrow; spleen; monocyte / Top expressed in: seminiferous tubule; spermatid; spermatocyte; primary oocyte; secondary oocyte; zygote; adrenal gland; pancreas; muscle tissue; islet of Langerhans; More reference expression data
BioGPS	n/a
Gene ontology
Molecular function	cytokine activity
Cellular component	membrane; extracellular space; integral component of membrane
Biological process	chemotaxis; regulation of signaling receptor activity; signal transduction
Sources:Amigo / QuickGO
Orthologs
Databases	NCBI: entry; OMA: entry
Species	Human	Mouse
Entrez	146225	75502
Ensembl	ENSG00000140932	ENSMUSG00000035785
UniProt	Q8TAZ6	Q9DAC0
RefSeq (mRNA)	NM_144673; NM_001199317	NM_028524
RefSeq (protein)	NP_001186246; NP_653274	NP_082800
Location (UCSC)	Chr 16: 66.58 – 66.59 Mb	Chr 8: 105.05 – 105.06 Mb
PubMed search
- Wikidata
View/Edit Human	View/Edit Mouse

CKLF-like MARVEL transmembrane domain-containing protein 2 (i.e. CMTM2), previously termed chemokine-like factor superfamily 2 ( i.e. CKLFSF2), is a member of the CKLF-like MARVEL transmembrane domain-containing family (CMTM) of proteins. In humans, it is encoded by the CMTM2 gene located in band 22 on the long (i.e. "q") arm of chromosome 16. CMTM2 protein is expressed in the bone marrow and various circulating blood cells. It is also highly expressed in testicular tissues: The CMTM2 gene and CMTM2 protein, it is suggested, may play an important role in testicular development.

Studies find that the levels of CMTM2 protein in hepatocellular carcinoma tissues of patients are lower than their levels in normal liver tissues. CMTM2 protein levels were also lower in the hepatocellular carcinoma tissues that had a more aggressive pathology and therefore a possible poorer prognosis. Finally, the forced overexpression of CMTM2 protein in cultured hepatocellular tumor cells inhibited their invasiveness and migration. These findings suggest that CMTM2 protein suppresses the development and/or progression of hepatocellular carcinoma and therefore that the CMTM2 gene acts as a tumor suppressor in this cancer. Patients with higher CMTM2 levels in their linitis plastica stomach cancer (i.e. a type of gastric cancer also termed diffuse-type gastric cancer or diffuse type adenocarcinoma of the stomach) tissues had better prognoses than patients with lower CMTM2 levels in their linitis plastica tissues. And, the CMTM2 gene has been found to be more highly expressed in the salivary gland adenoid cystic carcinoma tissues of patients who did not develop tumor recurrences or perineural invasion of their carcinomas compared to the expression of this gene in patients whose adenoid cystic carcinoma tissues went on to develop these complications. These findings suggest that the CMTM2 gene may act as a tumor suppressor not only in hepatocellular carcinoma but also in linitis plastica and salivary gland adenoid cystic carcinoma. Further studies are needed to confirm these findings and determine if CMTM2 protein can serve as a marker for the severity of these three cancers and/or as a therapeutic target for treating them.
