= Malignant ectomesenchymoma =

Malignant ectomesenchymoma (MEM) is a rare, fast-growing tumor of the nervous system or soft tissue that occurs in children and young adults. MEM is part of a group of small round blue cell tumors which includes neuroblastoma, rhabdomyosarcoma, non-Hodgkin's lymphoma, and the Ewing's family of tumors.

== Typical pathology ==
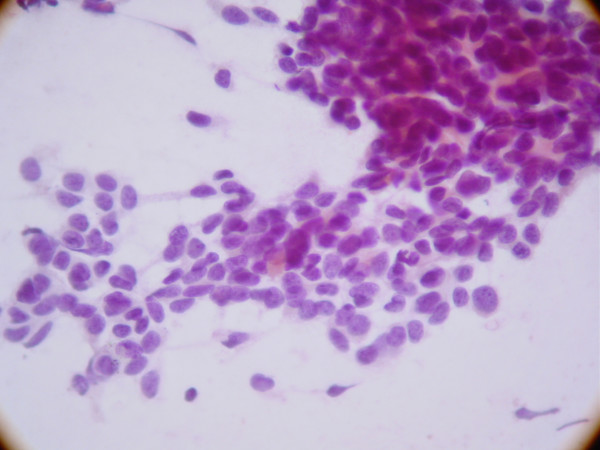
Small Blue Round Cell Tumor under a microscope

Malignant ectomesenchymomas may form in the head and neck, abdomen, perineum, scrotum, or limbs. The tumor is defined by its heterologous rhabdomyoblastic components. MEM histology is that of an elongated cell with an embryonic morphology. Onset time is relatively rapid and occurs early in life with the average age of onset is 0.6 years of age. However, children have been known to develop MEM up until they reach 5 years old. The neuroectodermal component has the potential to display any neuroblastic tumor including neuroblastoma, ganglioneuroblastoma, and ganglion cells with or without schwannian stroma. The rhabdomyoblastic component is derived from pluripotent migratory neural crest cells. The nature and wide migration patterns of neural crest cells allow them to give rise to both neural and non-nervous tissue including neurons, glia, smooth muscle, and melanocytes. Patients have the potential to display primary tumors in various locations prior to metastasis making this cancer particularly complicated.

=== Differing representations across patients ===
Unfortunately, heterogenous tumors have the potential to represent further heterogeneity between patients. Because of the rarity of cases, in 2014 there were only 64 cases reported in the literature, most studies of ectomesenchymoma are limited by very small cohort sizes. In an investigation of six cases, researchers attempted to create a profile for the different presentations in ectomesenchymomal tumors. Mesenchymal elements, represented by rhabdomyosarcoma, were the dominant component in the majority of cases (5/6) while embryonal and alveolar morphology had equal distribution (3/6). Patients with the alveolar subtype harbored the characteristic translocations including translocation of the FOXO1 gene fusing with the PAX3 or PAX7 gene. In the neuroectodermal component of the tumors, neuroblastic neoplasm was the most common presentation (4/6) and the other two cases represented a primitive neuroectodermal tumor-like morphology.

== Genetic factors ==
Several translocations and genetic markers have been identified as possible oncogenic transformations in ectomesenchymoma:

- FOXO1 fusion with PAX3 or PAX7 in alveolar expression
- Chromosome amplification of 6p21.32-p21.2 and 6p11.2 in embryonal RMS expression
  - Concurrent with increased expression of HMGA1 and HMGA2 proteins

Treatment with chemotherapy led to a reduction in amplification of 6p21.32-p21.2 and 6p11.2 leading to rescue of HMGA1 and HMGA2 protein expression.

== History ==
The first records of ectomesenchymoma are from 1971 in an investigation into neoplasms of mixed mesenchymal and neuroepithelial origin. In the same year another research group identified gangliorhabdomyosarcoma originating from the ectomesenchyme. The term ectomesenchymoma was first termed in 1977 to refer to a facial tumor found in a 6 month old female. This tumor persisted with evidence of regrowth 8 months after extensive debulking, triple chemotherapy, and radiation treatment. Biopsical investigation identified four different phenotypes present in the tumor and all were originally derived from the neural crest cell lineage. The varied nature of these tumors sparked questions about the transformational factors which lead to cancerous expression across multiple mature cell types. A publication in 2017 was the first to identify FOX01 gene rearrangements in ectomesemchymoma.

== Treatment and complications ==
Current treatment options for ectomesenchymomas are limited to traditional therapies as reported in the literature. Typical treatment options include chemotherapy, radiotherapy and surgical debulking when possible. Lack of specific therapies has the potential to cause discomfort and damage to the patient. Because most of the effected population of ectomesenchymoma are juveniles, the long term carcinogenic and developmental risk of radiation therapy is fairly high. Risk of development of leukemia and thyroid cancers also increases significantly with cancer treatment. Another major concern for chemotherapy and radiotherapy, particularly in the central nervous system and brain, is the potential developmental impacts.
