= CKLF like MARVEL transmembrane domain-containing 4 =

CMTM4

Identifiers
- Aliases: CMTM4, CKLFSF4, CKLF like MARVEL transmembrane domain containing 4
- External IDs: OMIM: 607887; MGI: 2142888; GeneCards: CMTM4

Gene location (Human)
Chr.	Chromosome 16 (human)
Band	16q21-q22.1	Start	66,614,750 bp
Band	16q21-q22.1	End	66,696,743 bp

Gene location (Mouse)
Chr.	Chromosome 8 (mouse)
Band	8|8 D3	Start	105,074,823 bp
Band	8|8 D3	End	105,122,439 bp
RNA expression pattern
Bgee	Human / Mouse (ortholog); Top expressed in: secondary oocyte; corpus epididymis; renal medulla; mucosa of ileum; bronchial epithelial cell; caput epididymis; endothelial cell; nasal epithelium; external globus pallidus; medulla oblongata / Top expressed in: otolith organ; utricle; transitional epithelium of urinary bladder; epithelium of stomach; subiculum; olfactory epithelium; anterior amygdaloid area; hand; left colon; paraventricular nucleus of hypothalamus; More reference expression data
BioGPS	n/a
Gene ontology
Molecular function	cytokine activity; protein binding
Cellular component	membrane; extracellular space; integral component of membrane
Biological process	chemotaxis; regulation of signaling receptor activity
Sources:Amigo / QuickGO
Orthologs
Databases	NCBI: entry; OMA: entry
Species	Human	Mouse
Entrez	146223	97487
Ensembl	ENSG00000183723	ENSMUSG00000096188
UniProt	Q8IZR5	Q8CJ61
RefSeq (mRNA)	NM_178818; NM_181521	NM_153582
RefSeq (protein)	NP_848933; NP_852662	NP_705810
Location (UCSC)	Chr 16: 66.61 – 66.7 Mb	Chr 8: 105.07 – 105.12 Mb
PubMed search
- Wikidata
View/Edit Human	View/Edit Mouse

CKLF-like MARVEL transmembrane domain-containing protein 4

Identifiers
- Symbol: CMTM4
- Alt. symbols: CKLFSF4
- Alt. names: Chemokine-like factor superfamily member 4
- HGNC: 19175
- OMIM: 607887
- RefSeq: NM_178818.3
- UniProt: Q8IZR5

Other data
- Locus: Chr. 16 q21-q22.1
Search for
- Structures: Swiss-model
- Domains: InterPro

CKLF like MARVEL transmembrane domain-containing 4 (i.e. CMTM4), formerly termed chemokine-like factor superfamily 4 (i.e. CKLFSF4), is a small transmembrane protein which passes the plasma membrane four times. It has 3 known isoforms, the CMTM4-v1 to CMTM4-v3 proteins. Protein isoforms are variant products that are made by alternative splicing of a single gene. The gene for the CMTM4 isoforms is located in band 22 on the long (i.e. "q") arm of chromosome 16. The CMTM4 gene and its 3 isoform proteins belong to the CKLF-like MARVEL transmembrane domain-containing family of structurally and functionally related genes and proteins. CMTM4-v1 and CMTM4-v2 are widely expressed in multiple human tissue while CMTM4-v3 has been detected only in the kidney and placental tissues.

The Cancer Genome Atlas indicates that CMTM4 protein is frequently reduced in colorectal cancer and its high expression is associated with increased overall survival rates in individuals with this cancer. CMTM4 protein was also found to be greatly reduced in the tissues of clear cell renal cell carcinoma compared to nearby normal renal (i.e. kidney) tissues and the forced overexpression of this protein in 786-O cells (a renal cancer cell line) inhibited their growth in culture as well as in a xenograph nude mouse model. Finally, CMTM4 protein levels were lower in several brain cancers, such as glioblastomas, neuroblastomas, and medulloblastomas, compared to their levels in nearby normal, non-tumorous brain tissues. These studies suggest CMTM4 may act to suppress these malignancies. Further studies are needed to confirm these relationships and determine if CMTM4 protein can be used as a marker for the severity of these malignancies and/or serve as a therapeutic target for treating them.

== CMTM4 in IL-17A signaling ==
Recently, CMTM4 has been identified to play a critical role in IL-17A signaling. The IL-17 receptor consists of two subunits: IL-17 receptor subunit A and C (IL-17RA, IL-17RC). CMTM4 was reported to be associated with the transmembrane domain of IL-17RC. This association proved to be critical for IL-17 signaling as CMTM4 knockout cells were unresponsive to IL-17A stimulation. Interestingly, lack of CMTM4 in cells caused an overall decrease in IL-17RC surface expression and impaired IL-17RC glycosylation. Altogether, CMTM4 regulates IL-17RC glycosylation status and its cellular localization.
