= Ectomesenchymoma =

Ectomesenchymoma is a rare, fast-growing tumor of the nervous system or soft tissue that occurs mainly in children, although cases have been reported in patients up to age 60. Ectomesenchymomas may form in the head and neck, abdomen, perineum, scrotum, or limbs. Also called malignant ectomesenchymoma.

Malignant ectomesenchymoma (MEM) is a rare tumor of soft tissues or the CNS, which is composed of both neuroectodermal elements [represented by ganglion cells and/or well-differentiated or poorly differentiated neuroblastic cells such as ganglioneuroma, ganglioneuroblastoma, neuroblastoma, peripheral primitive neuroectodermal tumors – PNET] and one or more mesenchymal neoplastic elements, usually rhabdomyosarcoma . The most accepted theory suggests that this tumor arises from remnants of migratory neural crest cells and thus from the ectomesenchyme.

== Clinical picture ==
The tumor largely affects children under 15 years of age and about 20% only are found in adults with nearly 60% involving males and 40% females (1). The most frequent locations are head and neck (orbit and nasopharynx), central nervous system, abdomen and retroperitoneum, pelvis, perineum, scrotum and prostate(1). Clinical symptoms are not specific and usually caused by local tumor compression and infiltration.

== Histopathology ==
The main features of this tumor is to comprise either ectodermal derivatives (neuroblasts and ganglion cells) or mesenchymal components mostly represented by plump, elongated cells in interlacing bundles often showing rhabdomyoblastic differentiation, including strap-like and racket-shaped cells (2-6). A myofibril-like structure and cross striations can be identified. Liposarcoma-like and chondroid foci can be an additional finding. Fibrosarcoma-like and fibrous histiocytoma-like areas can be observed as well as neurofibromatous and neuroblastic components with rosette formation. Ganglion cells can appear immature and atypical, they can be bi- or multinucleated and showing evidence of Nissl substance (2-6). Rhabdomyoblasts and poorly differentiated small cells display positivity for desmin and myosin while neural areas are variably sensitive to S-100. Ganglion cells are strongly positive for NSE. It is important to point out that the ectodermal component may be sometimes scanty and can be overlooked whereas in specimens after chemotherapy the ganglioneuroma component is increased and even overwhelming. Differential diagnosis should consider rhabdomyosarcoma, Triton tumor, teratoma, Wilms tumor and benign, mature ectomesenchymoma (ectomesenchymal hamartoma).

== Research ==
Goldsby et al. reported an ectomesenchymoma of the kidney showing hyperdiploid count and a translocation between chromosomes 12 and 15 (8). Floris et al. found in their reported case hyperploidy in a subset of cells as well as gains of chromosomes 2, 11 and 20, a finding in common with alveolar rhabdomyosarcoma. They found as well 2 distinctive chromosome 6p21.32-p21.2 and 6p11.2 amplification regions in the primary tumor which disappeared in the postchemotherapy specimen. Furthermore, the pretreatment biopsy showed strong expression of HMGA1 and HMGA2 proteins by immunohistochemistry and loss of expression after therapy thereby crediting the HMGA family of proteins for oncogenic expansion (9).

== Historic background ==
MEM comprises a heterogeneous group of neoplasms believed to originate from the neural crest. First hints to this type of tumor were probably from Shuangshoti and Nestky (1971) and from Holimon and Rosenblum (1971) (2-3). Additional contributions were provided thereafter by Naka et al. (1975), Karcioglu et al. (1977), Cozzutto et al. (1982) and Kawamoto et al. (1987). Kosem et al. collected 44 cases of MEM in a 2004 review and examined management data finding out that resection with pre- or post-surgery chemotherapy yielded the best results with one death only in 13. In the five cases reported by Mouton et al. an aggressive chemotherapy and adequate surgical excision granted a disease-free interval for 7 to 50 months. The attainability of radical surgical ablation seems the most important prognostic factor (10).
