= Spindle cell rhabdomyosarcoma =

Medical condition

Spindle cell rhabdomyosarcoma is a subtype of embryonal rhabdomyosarcoma first described by Cavazzana, Schmidt and Ninfo in 1992. This subtype has a more favorable clinical course and prognosis than usual embryonal rhabdomyosarcoma. Spindle cell rhabdomyosarcoma typically occurs in young males and most commonly occurs in paratesticular soft tissue, followed by the head and neck.
