= Sclerosing rhabdomyosarcoma =

- Specialty: Oncology

Sclerosing rhabdomyosarcoma is a rare subtype of rhabdomyosarcoma that was characterized by Folpe et al. in 2002. It is microscopically characterized by primitive round cells forming microalveoli, nests, and cords in a sclerotic background.
