= Myxofibrosarcoma =

- Specialty: Dermatology, Dermatopathology, Pathology, Surgical oncology, Oncology
- Types: Epithelioid myxofibrosarcoma
- Causes: Unknown
- Prognosis: Guarded

Myxofibrosarcoma (MFS), although a rare type of tumor, is one of the most common soft tissue sarcomas, i.e., cancerous tumors, that develop in the soft tissues of elderly individuals. Initially considered to be a type of histiocytoma termed fibrous histiocytoma or myxoid variant of malignant fibrous histiocytoma, Angervall et al. termed this tumor myxofibrosarcoma in 1977. In 2020, the World Health Organization reclassified MFS as a separate and distinct tumor in the category of malignant fibroblastic and myofibroblastic tumors.

MFS tumors are often treated by surgical resection. However, these tumors have high recurrence rates at the sites of their resections. Local recurrences followed by surgical resections may be repeated multiple times but during these cycles MFS tumors often progress from a lower grade to a higher more aggressive grade, metastasize, and become life-threatening. An uncommon variant of the MFS tumors termed epithelioid myxofibrosarcoma is even more likely to follow an aggressive, recurrent, metastasizing, and life-threatening course than the more common form of the MFS tumors.

== Presentation ==
MFS usually afflicts individuals in their fifth to seventh decades of life although uncommon cases occur in adults outside of this age range In one large study, MFS was diagnosed in individuals 21 to 96 years old (median age 66 years). Most studies have diagnosed MFS slightly more often in men than women but one large study conducted in France found it to be 50% more common in men. Individuals with MFS present with a tumor located in an extremity (77% of cases, usually in the lower extremity), trunk (12% of cases), and head and neck areas (3% of cases). Rarely, these tumors have presented in the breast, heart, paratesticular region (i.e. area inside the scrotum including the epididymis the spermatic cord along with its coverings), eye, bone, liver, or multiple sites concurrently. Primary tumors presenting in the abdominal cavity, retroperitoneum, or pelvis have been diagnosed as MFS but larger studies indicate that these tumors are far more likely to be dedifferentiated liposarcomas. MFS tumors usually develop as painless, slowly enlarging masses in a muscle, skin (usually below the fascia i.e. a sheet of connective tissue, primarily collagen, running beneath the skin), or one of the non-cutaneous areas described above. In one study of 69 FBS cases 36 were <5 cm, 23 were between 5 and 10 cm, and 19 were > 10 cm in diameter with the largest tumor being 27 cm. MFS tumors often infiltrate along vascular and fascial planes, are incompletely removed at surgery, and consequently recur at the surgical site. Recurrences of the MFS at the site of surgery have developed in 16% to 57% of patients with a significant proportion (25%–52%) recurring multiple times. In one study, recurrences developed between 2 and 82 months (median 53 months) following primary surgery and metastatic disease developed in 23% of patients within 2 to 77 months (median 10 months) following primary surgery. Recurrent tumors tend to be more aggressive and have a much greater tendency to metastasize than primary MFS tumors. In one study, metastatic disease was detected in 23% of patients and occurred at a median of 10 months (range, 2–77 months) after resection of the primary tumor. In a review of multiple studies, the risk of developing metastases for lower grade MFS (defined in the following section) was <5% and for higher grade tumors was 25–30%. MFS metastasize most commonly to the lungs, bone, and lymph-nodes.

Individuals with the epithelioid variant of FBS generally present with a tumor in the limbs; the tumors tend to be somewhat larger, more aggressive, and more likely to metastasize than the tumors in non-variant cases. At least 50% of patients with this variant have developed metastases.

== Pathology ==
The microscopic histopathology of hematoxylin and eosin stained FBS tumors varies. Lower-grade MFS tissues consist of scattered large, variability-sized and spindle-shaped-to-variably-shaped tumor cells with darkly stained nuclei. Overall, lower-grade tumors contain relatively few cells within a distinctive myxoid (i.e. more blue or purple compared to normal connective tissue because of excessive uptake of the hematoxylin stain) connective tissue background that contains curvilinear, thin-walled blood vessels. Higher grade FBS tumors consist of relatively large sheets of these spindle-shaped/vatiably-shaped cells in a similar myxoid background containing thin-walled curvilinear blood vessels. Pseudo-lipoblasts (i.e. multivacuolated cells resembling lipoblasts but having vacuoles filled with mucin rather than lipids) are apparent in both lower grade and higher grade tumors. Epithelioid FBS tumors are highly cellular lesions consisting of diffuse proliferations of extremely large, polygonal-shaped epithelioid cells set in a myxoid connective tissue background similar to that seen in the other types of FBS. Epithelioid myxofibrosarcomas appear to behave more aggressively than myxofibrosarcomas dominated by spindle-shaped/variably-shaped cells. While the cells in most types of tumors express specific marker proteins that help in diagnosing them, the tumor cells in FBS and its epithelioid variant have not yet been found to express marker proteins that are sufficiently specific to support either diagnosis.

== Chromosome and gene abnormalities ==
Most cases of MFS have tumor cells that contain complex chromosome and/or gene abnormalities including ring chromosomes (i.e. chromosome whose ends are fused together to form a ring), double minutes (i.e. small fragments of extrachromosomal DNA), chromosomes with deletions of part of their genetic material, and chromosome translocations (i.e. abnormal switches in genetic material between different chromosomes). There were no apparent differences in these abnormalities between lower grade and higher grade tumors but their numbers were higher and more prevalent in recurrent tumors. These forms of chromosome/gene cytogenetic alterations are commonly found in various tumor types regardless of their grade or severity. Tumor cell mutations or deletions in the NF1 gene occur ~10% of MFS cases while mutations in the CDKN2A/CDKN2B and amplifications in the CDK6, CCND1, and MDM2 genes occur in rare MFS cases. While the cells in many tumor types express specific chromosome/gene abnormalities that help in determining their diagnoses, the cited chromosome and gene abnormalities discovered in TBS tumor cells have not yet been found specific enough to be of help in diagnosing MFS. The chromosome/gene abnormalities have not yet been defined in the epithelioid variant of MFS.

== Diagnosis ==
The diagnosis of MBS is heavily dependent on the presentation and histopathology of its tumors. Of particular importance, the presence of pseudo-lipoblasts in a myxoid sarcoma-like background is an extremely strong indicator that the tumor is a MFS. and tumors with a myxofibrosarcoma-like histopathology that initiate in the retroperitoneum, abdominal cavity, or pelvis are nearly always dedifferentiated liposarcomas. Magnetic resonance imaging (MRI) has been helpful in diagnosing MBS. On T2-weighted MRI, 81% of MFS tumors give a tail sign, i.e. a multidirectional signal spreading away from the main mass along a facial plane (i.e. a line or band of connective tissue). Among all myxoid-predominant tissue lesions, this MRI method diagnoses MBS with a specificity of 79% to 90%. This MRI finding is also extremely valuable for gauging the extent and depth of surgery needed to completely remove MBS tumors.

== Treatment and prognosis ==
The recommended treatment for individuals presenting with localized MFS tumors is radical surgical resection. The resection should include a 2 cm margin of soft tissue surrounding the tumor, with planned resection of the entire area as defined by MRI-detected increased signals on T2-weighted images. This is done to ensure that all tumor tissue is removed in order to avoid the high risks of local recurrences and worsening prognoses. Historically, about 10% of patients treated with radical surgery developed recurrences at the surgical site and a significant number of these patients developed metastatic disease. Consequently, adjuvant radiotherapy has been used to help reduce these recurrences and metastatic transformations. For patients with a limb tumor that cannot be resected (less than 5% of all cases)), limb amputation is the treatment of choice. Recurrent and metastatic MFS first-line treatment has employed two chemotherapy drugs, anthracycline and Ifosfamide, while second-line treatment has employed two other chemotherapy drugs, gemcitabine and paclitaxel. Triple chemotherapy drug treatment (adriamycin, ifosfamide, and dacarbazine) has also been used to treat MFS. However, there are no randomized clinical trials evaluating the efficacy of these or other chemotherapy drugs in the treatment of inoperable or metastatic MFS and none of the uncontrolled studies have demonstrated a benefit in improving the overall survival in MFS. Current drug therapies that are or may soon be tried in treating MFS include angiogenesis inhibitors and immunotherapeutics such as Bevacizumab and Nivolumab.

In one review of 109 individuals with MFS: overall survival for the entire group was 80% at 3 years and 76% at 5 years; local recurrence-free survival was 95% at 3 years and 88% at 5 years; median survival following local recurrence was 68 months; distant metastasis-free survival was 78% at 3 and 77% at 5 years; and 18 of 25 patients (72%) died of metastatic disease during a median follow-up time of 42 months for the overall review period of study. In three large studies, overall 5 year disease-specific survival times (i.e. the percentage of patients surviving 5 years excluding death due to any other causes than MFS from this count) were 51%, 73%, and 96%.
