= Keratinizing metaplasia =

- Specialty: Dermatology

Keratinizing metaplasia is a condition affecting the epithelial surfaces of the body. It is caused by a dietary deficiency of vitamin A, a fat-soluble vitamin that is most often found in fats, milk, and some leafy vegetables.

== See also ==
- List of cutaneous conditions
