= Low-grade myofibroblastic sarcoma =

- Other names: Intermediate-grade myofibroblastic sarcoma is now regarded as a low-grade myofibroblastic sarcoma
- Symptoms: Tumor, sometimes painful
- Complications: Post-surgical recurrences; uncommonly metastasizes
- Usual onset: All ages
- Causes: Unknown
- Treatment: Surgical removal of tumor
- Prognosis: Guarded
- Deaths: Uncommon

Low-grade myofibroblastic sarcoma (LGMS) is a subtype of the malignant sarcomas. As it is currently recognized, LGMS was first described as a rare, atypical myofibroblastic tumor (i.e. a tumor consisting of cells with the microscopic features of fibroblasts and smooth muscle cells) by Mentzel et al. in 1998. Myofibroblastic sarcomas had been divided into low-grade myofibroblastic sarcomas, intermediate‐grade myofibroblasic sarcomas, i.e. IGMS, and high‐grade myofibroblasic sarcomas, i.e. HGMS (also termed undifferentiated pleomorphic sarcoma and pleomorphic myofibrosarcoma [and formerly termed malignant fibrous histiocytoma]) based on their microscopic morphological, immunophenotypic, and malignancy features. LGMS and IGMS are now classified together by the World Health Organization (WHO), 2020, in the category of intermediate (rarely metastasizing) fibroblastic and myofibroblastic tumors. WHO, 2020, classifies HGMS (preferred name: undifferentiated pleomorphic sarcoma) as a soft tissue tumor in the category of tumors of uncertain differentiation. This article follows the WHO classification: here, LGMS includes IGMS but not HGMS which is a more aggressive and metastasizing tumor than LGMS and consists of cells of uncertain origin.

LGMS tumors are typically painless lesions that develop in: 1) the subcutaneous tissues, i.e. the lowermost layer of the skin; 2) submucosa, i.e. the thin layer of tissue lying just below the mucous membranes that line passageways such as the gastrointestinal, respiratory, genitourinary tracts; 3) muscles; and 4) bones. They most often develop in middle-aged adults (average: 40 years old) but have been diagnosed in all age-groups. These tumors often recur at the sites of their surgical removal and may metastasize to nearby lymph nodes and distant tissues.

LGMS's are commonly treated by surgical removal of the tumor along with all its cells, which if not removed increase the probability that the tumor will recur at the site of its removal. LGMS tumors typically show little or no sensitivity to radiotherapy and chemotherapy treatments.

== Presentation ==
LGMS present as single tumors that ranged in size from 0.4 to 24.0 cm in three literature review studies. In another study, 103 individuals diagnosed with LGMS were aged 2–75 years (median: 43 years) with 12.6% < 18 years, 65.1% 18–60 years, and 22.3% >60 years old. Eighty-two percent of their LGMS tumors were located in soft tissues (28.2% in mucous membranes, 21.8% in muscle, 19.2% in skin, and 12.9% in other soft tissues) and 18% were in bone. Overall, 51.5% of their tumors were in the head and neck areas (most commonly the tongue, followed by the larynx, gums, mandible, face, skull, and ear canal), 25.2% were in the trunk, and 23.3% were in an arm or leg. Bone tumors were located in the femurs, mandible, maxilla, tibias, or in one case each the hard palate and sacrum. In other reports, the tumors occurred in the oral mucosa, lip, groin, small intestine, greater omentum or lesser omentum (which omentum not defined), heart, eye socket (in an 11 month old infant), and chest wall/breast. While typically presenting as slow growing, painless masses, some individuals have presented with increasingly painful subcutaneous or submucosal masses (16 of 50 individuals reported pain in one retrospective study). Rare cases of submucosal LGMS tumors have presented with more serious symptoms such as partial bowel obstructions due to intrabdominal LGMS tumors, shortness of breath and palpitations due to a LGMS tumor in the heart, difficulty in swallowing and breathing due to a laryngeal LGMS tumor, and abdominal pain due to a pancreas LGMS tumor. A study of 96 individuals presenting for the first time with LGMS found that 51.0% had local disease, 25.0% had regional disease, 15.6% had metastases to the local lymph nodes, and 8.3% had distant metastases. (In the study 103 individuals, the distant metastasis rate was 4.4%.) Metastasis have been reported to develop in various sites including the lungs, pleura, lymph nodes, bones, thoracic cavity, abdominal cavity, peritoneum, heart, brain, and spinal cord.

== Pathology ==
Microscopic histopathological analyses of hematoxylin and eosin stained LGMS tissues generally show bundles of atypical spindle-shaped cells in a variably hyalinized (i.e. glassy appearing) stromal background containing collagen fibers. The tumors are not encapsulated and commonly infiltrate adjacent fibrous, fat, or skeletal muscle tissues. (The tumor's spindle-shaped cells may infiltrate between individual skeletal muscle fibers to create a characteristic checkerboard pattern.) LGMS tissues commonly have small or more extensive foci of epithelioid (i.e. epithelial-like) cells with a polygonal shape. In a minority of cases, the tumor tissues have scattered mast cells, sites of numerous neutrophils, and areas of necrosis (i.e. dead or dying cells).

Immunohistochemical analyses find that the LGMS tumors' spindle-shaped cells commonly express ACTA2 (also known α-smooth muscle actin) and desmin (i.e. an intermediate filament protein found in all muscle forms including smooth muscle) proteins, with some tumors composed of cells expressing both of these proteins and other tumors composed of cells expressing only one of them. The tumor cells often express vimentin and SMARCB1 (also termed INI-1 and SNF5) proteins but typically fail to express CD34, S-100, CD34, STAT6, CD68, CD56, cytokeratin, ERG, β-catenin, or myogenin proteins. The epithelioid, polygonal-shaped cells express cytokeratin and TP63 proteins.

== Chromosome and gene abnormalities ==
Various chromosome abnormalities have been found in the tumor cells of a few LGMS cases. A ring chromosome and/or giant marker chromosome, which commonly occur in the cells of various mesenchymal tumors, were found in one case of LGMS. In addition, these tumor cells may, in rare cases, contain copy number variations such as gains in the genetic material on the short (i.e. 'p') arm of chromosomes 1, 12, and 5 and losses in genetic material on the long (i.e. 'q') arm of chromosome 15. These chromosome abnormalities are considered non-specific. Analysis of LGMS tumor cells for chromosome and gene abnormalities has not yet been helpful in understanding or diagnosing the disorder.

== Diagnosis ==
LGMS should be suspected in cases presenting as nodular masses composed of spindle-shaped cells combining fibroblast and smooth muscle cell features that are arranged in bundles and express α-smooth muscle actin and/or desmin proteins but not vimentin, S-100, CD34 or other marker proteins cited in the previous section. Spindle-shaped cell infiltrations between individual skeletal muscle fibers that form a checkerboard pattern and the presence of foci containing epithelioid, polygonal cells that express cytokeratin and TP63 proteins are also indicative of a LGMS tumor.

== Treatment and prognosis ==
Past treatments for LGMS, including surgery, radiotherapy, and chemotherapy, have not been systematically investigated nor validated. Currently, the primary and most common treatment for non-metastatic LGMS is surgical resection with, where possible, removal of all tumor cells in order to reduce this tumor's recurrence rate (e.g. ~27% and ~38% in two different studies). Following this surgery, individuals should undergo long-term observation to check for post-surgical recurrences and the uncommon instances of metastases. One study suggested that tumor cells with high rates of proliferation, tumors containing areas of necrosis, tumor sizes >10 cm in largest diameters, and deep-seated tumors are at higher risks for metastasizing.

Radiotherapy and chemotherapy have been used with or without surgical resections to treat cases in which tumor resections were later found to leave tumor cells behind, in which tumors could not be safely resected, and in which metastases were present. In the study of 96 individuals presenting with LGMS tumors for the first time, 89.6% received surgical treatment, 29.2% received radiation treatment, and 20% received chemotherapy. The study concluded that radiotherapy and chemotherapy had limited effects on survival and therefore should not be routinely used in LGMS, especially for cases in which all tumor cells are removed. These results and conclusions agree with previous reports finding that LGMS tumors are insensitive to radiotherapy and chemotherapy. Nonetheless, there have been case reports that local radiotherapy may allow longer survival periods and may, in select cases, be useful for treating LGMS. A similar situation exists with chemotherapy: some reports recommend chemotherapy as a potential treatment strategy, particularly when complete excision of the tumor is not possible, when the tumor is highly invasive, and/or when the tumor has spread to lymph nodes and/or distant tissues. There are case reports where chemotherapy following surgical excision may have been useful in prolonging progression-free survival, for example, in an individual with a pancreatic LGMS tumor (treatment regimen: ifosfamide, pirarubicin, and nedaplatin). Further studies are needed to define the usefulness of radiation therapy and chemotherapy in LGMS.

The majority of studies on the prognosis of patients treated for LGMS have focused on short-term (i.e. one-year) follow-up times. One study of 49 patients (age range: 29.5–64.5; average age: 46.2 years; median age: 51.0 years) treated for LGFS reported overall survival percentages at 3 and 5 years of 75.0% and 71.6%, respectively. Their disease-specific survival (i.e. excluding deaths from causes unrelated to LGMS) at 3 and 5 years after treatment were 80.0% and 76.3%, respectively. These patients were treated with surgery in 93.9% of cases and radiotherapy in 26.5% of cases but no patients had lymph node metastasis and only 1 case had distant metastases (the presence of lymph node and distant tissue metastasis was unknown in 8 patients). The study of 96 individuals treated for LFMS reported 1, 3, 5, and 10-year disease-specific survival percentages of 88%, 77%, 70%, and 59%, respectively. Patient age >60 years was the only factor that clearly reduced survival times in this study (disease specific survival times for patients 60 years old or younger and >60 years were 167.1 and 92.5 months, respectively).
