= CKLF (gene) =

Protein-coding gene in the species Homo sapiens

Identifiers
- Aliases: CKLF, C32, CKLF1, CKLF2, CKLF3, CKLF4, UCK-1, HSPC224, chemokine-like factor, chemokine like factor
- External IDs: OMIM: 616074; MGI: 1922708; HomoloGene: 9663; GeneCards: CKLF; OMA:CKLF - orthologs

Gene location (Human)
Chr.	Chromosome 16 (human)
Band	16q21	Start	66,552,563 bp
Band	16q21	End	66,566,251 bp

Gene location (Mouse)
Chr.	Chromosome 8 (mouse)
Band	8|8 D3	Start	104,977,493 bp
Band	8|8 D3	End	104,991,570 bp
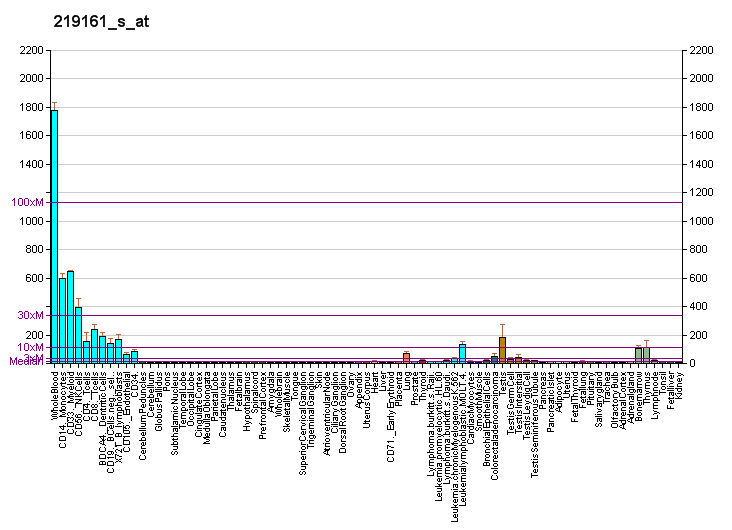

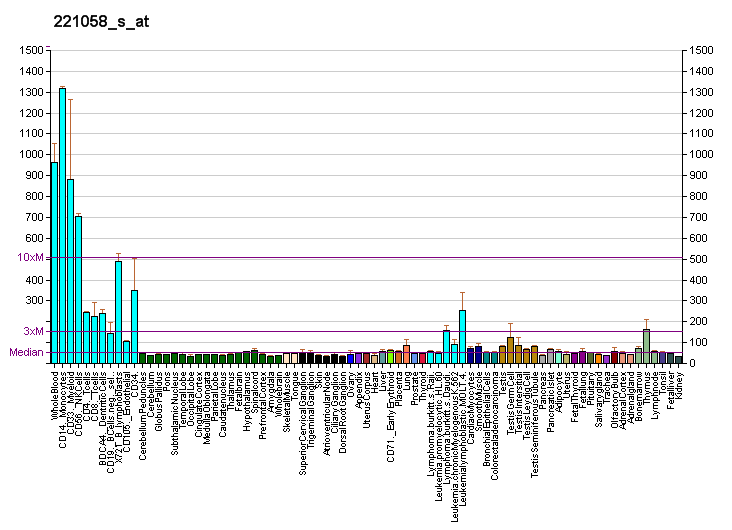
RNA expression pattern
Bgee	Human / Mouse (ortholog); Top expressed in: monocyte; granulocyte; blood; appendix; lymph node; spleen; left testis; right testis; islet of Langerhans; rectum / Top expressed in: spermatocyte; spermatid; seminiferous tubule; granulocyte; adrenal gland; medullary collecting duct; spleen; tail of embryo; renal corpuscle; endothelial cell of lymphatic vessel; More reference expression data
BioGPS	More reference expression data
Gene ontology
Molecular function	chemokine activity; cytokine activity
Cellular component	integral component of membrane; extracellular region; membrane; extracellular space
Biological process	lymphocyte chemotaxis; chemotaxis; macrophage chemotaxis; cell population proliferation; secretion by cell; neutrophil chemotaxis; leukocyte chemotaxis; regulation of signaling receptor activity; signal transduction
Sources:Amigo / QuickGO
Orthologs
Species	Human	Mouse
Entrez	51192	75458
Ensembl	ENSG00000217555	ENSMUSG00000054400
UniProt	Q9UBR5	Q9DAS1
RefSeq (mRNA)	NM_181641; NM_001040138; NM_001040139; NM_016326; NM_016951 NM_181640	NM_001037840; NM_001037841; NM_001286383; NM_029295; NM_029313
RefSeq (protein)	NP_001035228; NP_057410; NP_058647; NP_857591; NP_857592	NP_001032930; NP_001273312; NP_083571
Location (UCSC)	Chr 16: 66.55 – 66.57 Mb	Chr 8: 104.98 – 104.99 Mb
PubMed search
- Wikidata
View/Edit Human	View/Edit Mouse

Chemokine-like factor (CKLF) is a member of the CKLF-like MARVEL transmembrane domain-containing family of proteins that in humans is encoded by the CKLF gene. This gene is located on band 22.1 in the long (i.e. "q") arm of chromosome 16.

== Isoforms ==
Through the process of alternative splicing, the CKLF gene encodes 4 CKLF protein isoforms, i.e. proteins made from different areas of the same gene. These isoforms are 1) CKLF1 and CKLF3 proteins that consist of 99 and 67 amino acids, respectively, and are secreted from their parent cells and 2) CKLF2 (which is the full-length product of the CKLF gene) and CKLF4 proteins which consist of 152 and 120 amino acids, respectively, and are located in the membranes of their parent cells.

=== CKLF1 ===
CKLF1 is the first member of the CKLF-like MARVEL transmembrane domain-containing family of proteins to be defined and the most investigated of its four isoforms. Studies conducted in freshly isolated cells, cultured cells, animals, and tissue samples indicate that CKLF1 is a chemokine-like chemotactic factor that acts through the CCR4 receptors on human CD4+ Th2 lymphocytes, neutrophils, monocytes, macrophages, dendritic cells, and perhaps other CCR4-receptor bearing cells. Preliminary findings suggest that the actions of CKLF1 on these CCR4-bearing cells may contribute to the maturation of various tissues such as blood cells and skeletal muscle from their precursor cells and the regulation of allergic (e.g. asthma), autoimmune (e.g. rheumatoid arthritis and the antiphospholipid syndrome), and inflammatory (e.g. acute respiratory distress syndrome) disorders. Other studies have found that: 1) the benign fibrous skin tumor, keloids, had higher levels of CKLF1 and CKLF1 mRNA than nearby normal skin tissues; 2) CKLF1 levels were higher in ovarian carcinoma tissues than nearby normal ovary tissues and patients with higher levels of CKLF1 in their ovarian cancer tissues had a more aggressive cancer than patients with lover levels of the protein in their ovarian cancer tissues; and 3) the levels of CKLF1 protein were higher in cancerous than nearby normal liver tissues in patients with hepatocellular carcinoma (HCC) and patients with higher HCC tissue levels of CKLF1 had poorer overall survival times than patients with lower levels of this protein in their HCC tissues. These results suggest that high levels of CKLF1 promote the development and/or progression of these three neoplasms although further studies are required to further define these relationships and to determine if CKLF1 can be used as a marker for their severity and/or a therapeutic target for treating them.

=== CKLF2–4 ===
Relative little is known about the normal functions and pathological actions of the CKLF2, CKLF3, and CKLF4 isoforms.
