= AMP deaminase 2 =

Protein found in humans

AMPD2

Identifiers
- Aliases: AMPD2, PCH9, SPG63, adenosine monophosphate deaminase 2
- External IDs: OMIM: 102771; MGI: 88016; GeneCards: AMPD2
Available structures
PDB	Ortholog search: PDBe RCSB
PDB	List of PDB id codes 4NO3, 4NO5
Enzyme activity
EC #	BRENDA	ExPASy	KEGG	MetaCyc
3.5.4.6	↗	↗	↗	↗

Gene location (Human)
Chr.	Chromosome 1 (human)
Band	1p13.3	Start	109,616,104 bp
Band	1p13.3	End	109,632,051 bp

Gene location (Mouse)
Chr.	Chromosome 3 (mouse)
Band	3 F2.3|3 46.83 cM	Start	107,981,378 bp
Band	3 F2.3|3 46.83 cM	End	107,993,967 bp
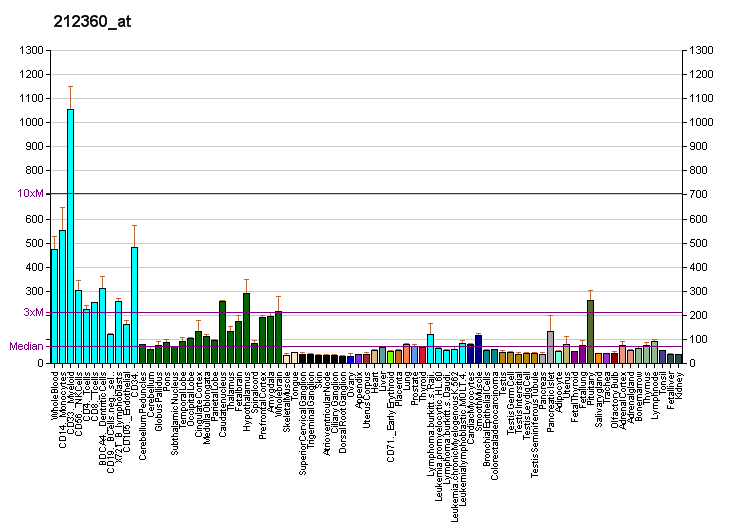
RNA expression pattern
Bgee	Human / Mouse (ortholog); Top expressed in: anterior pituitary; granulocyte; nucleus accumbens; pancreatic ductal cell; stromal cell of endometrium; right frontal lobe; monocyte; putamen; caudate nucleus; blood / Top expressed in: fossa; arcuate nucleus; ventromedial nucleus; condyle; mammillary body; motor neuron; internal carotid artery; Rostral migratory stream; external carotid artery; lateral hypothalamus; More reference expression data
BioGPS	More reference expression data
Gene ontology
Molecular function	hydrolase activity; metal ion binding; deaminase activity; protein binding; AMP deaminase activity
Cellular component	cellular component; cytosol
Biological process	purine ribonucleoside monophosphate biosynthetic process; IMP salvage; cyclic purine nucleotide metabolic process; nucleotide metabolic process; purine-containing compound salvage; IMP biosynthetic process; energy homeostasis; AMP metabolic process
Sources:Amigo / QuickGO
Orthologs
Databases	NCBI: entry; OMA: entry
Species	Human	Mouse
Entrez	271	109674
Ensembl	ENSG00000116337	ENSMUSG00000027889
UniProt	Q01433	Q9DBT5
RefSeq (mRNA)	NM_001257360; NM_001257361; NM_001308170; NM_004037; NM_139156 NM_203404; NM_001368809	NM_001289719; NM_001289720; NM_028779; NM_001346665
RefSeq (protein)	NP_001244289; NP_001244290; NP_001295099; NP_004028; NP_631895 NP_001355738	NP_001276648; NP_001276649; NP_001333594; NP_083055
Location (UCSC)	Chr 1: 109.62 – 109.63 Mb	Chr 3: 107.98 – 107.99 Mb
PubMed search
- Wikidata
View/Edit Human	View/Edit Mouse

AMP deaminase 2 is an enzyme that in humans is encoded by the AMPD2 gene.

High AMPD2 expression levels correlate with poor patient outcome and a proliferative tumor phenotype in undifferentiated pleomorphic sarcoma (UPS).
