= SSX5 =

Protein-coding gene in the species Homo sapiens

Identifiers
- Aliases: SSX5, SSX family member 5
- External IDs: OMIM: 300327; GeneCards: SSX5

Gene location (Human)
Chr.	X chromosome (human)
Band	Xp11.23	Start	48,186,220 bp
Band	Xp11.23	End	48,196,795 bp
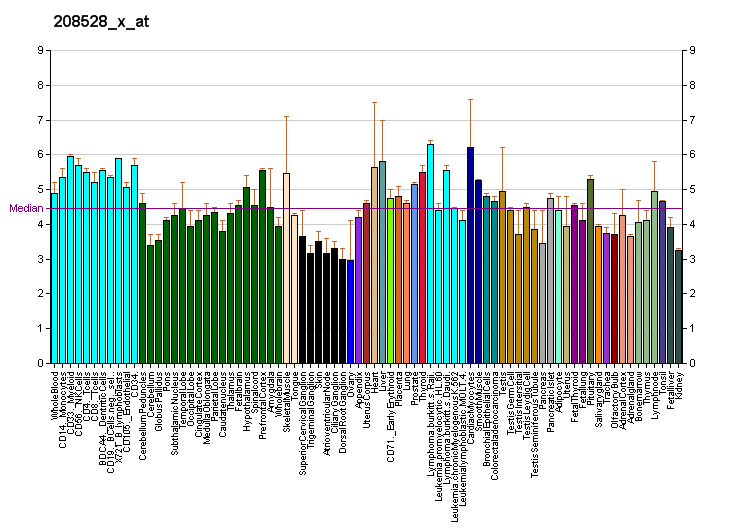
RNA expression pattern
Bgee	Human / Mouse (ortholog); Top expressed in: gonad; testicle; right uterine tube; pharynx; human musculoskeletal system; tonsil; placenta; renal cortex; muscular system; muscle / n/a; More reference expression data
BioGPS	More reference expression data
Gene ontology
Molecular function	protein binding; transcription corepressor activity; nucleic acid binding
Cellular component	intracellular anatomical structure; nucleus
Biological process	negative regulation of nucleic acid-templated transcription; regulation of transcription, DNA-templated; transcription, DNA-templated
Sources:Amigo / QuickGO
Orthologs
Databases	NCBI: entry; OMA: entry
Species	Human	Mouse
Entrez	6758	n/a
Ensembl	ENSG00000165583	n/a
UniProt	O60225	n/a
RefSeq (mRNA)	NM_021015; NM_175723	n/a
RefSeq (protein)	NP_066295; NP_783729	n/a
Location (UCSC)	Chr X: 48.19 – 48.2 Mb	n/a
PubMed search		n/a
- Wikidata
View/Edit Human

Protein SSX5 is a protein that in humans is encoded by the SSX5 gene.

== Function ==
The product of this gene belongs to the family of highly homologous synovial sarcoma, X (SSX) breakpoint proteins. These proteins may function as transcriptional repressors. They are also capable of eliciting spontaneously humoral and cellular immune responses in cancer patients, and are potentially useful targets in cancer vaccine-based immunotherapy. SSX1, SSX2 and SSX4 genes have been involved in the t(X;18) chromosomal translocation characteristically found in all synovial sarcomas. This gene appears not to be involved in this type of translocation. Two transcript variants encoding distinct isoforms have been identified for this gene.
