= SSX6 =

Pseudogene in the species Homo sapiens

SSX6P

Identifiers
- Aliases: SSX6P, SSXP2, SSX family member 6, pseudogene, SSX6, dJ54B20.1, psiSSX2, synovial sarcoma, X breakpoint 6 (pseudogene)
- External IDs: OMIM: 300541; GeneCards: SSX6P; OMA:SSX6P - orthologs
Orthologs
Species	Human	Mouse
Entrez	280657	n/a
Ensembl	n/a	n/a
UniProt	n a	n/a
RefSeq (mRNA)	NM_173357	n/a
RefSeq (protein)	n/a	n/a
Location (UCSC)	n/a	n/a
PubMed search		n/a
- Wikidata
View/Edit Human

SSX family member 6, pseudogene is a protein that in humans is encoded by the SSX6 gene.

== Function ==
This gene belongs to the family of highly homologous synovial sarcoma X (SSX) breakpoint proteins. These proteins may function as transcriptional repressors. They are also capable of eliciting spontaneously humoral and cellular immune responses in cancer patients, and are potentially useful targets in cancer vaccine-based immunotherapy.

SSX1, SSX2, and SSX4 genes have been involved in the t(X;18) translocation characteristically found in all synovial sarcomas. This gene is classified as a pseudogene because a splice donor in the 3' UTR has changed compared to other family members, rendering the transcript a candidate for nonsense-mediated mRNA decay (NMD). [provided by RefSeq, Aug 2009].
