= SS18L1 =

Protein-coding gene in the species Homo sapiens

Identifiers
- Aliases: SS18L1, CREST, LP2261, nBAF chromatin remodeling complex subunit, SS18L1 subunit of BAF chromatin remodeling complex, SMARCL2
- External IDs: OMIM: 606472; MGI: 2444061; GeneCards: SS18L1

Gene location (Human)
Chr.	Chromosome 20 (human)
Band	20q13.33	Start	62,143,769 bp
Band	20q13.33	End	62,182,514 bp

Gene location (Mouse)
Chr.	Chromosome 2 (mouse)
Band	2|2 H4	Start	179,684,302 bp
Band	2|2 H4	End	179,711,994 bp
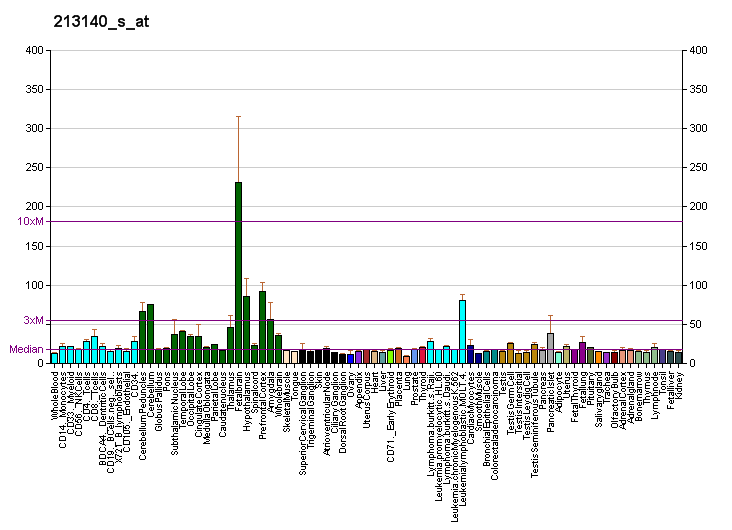
RNA expression pattern
Bgee	Human / Mouse (ortholog); Top expressed in: lateral nuclear group of thalamus; cerebellar vermis; cerebellar hemisphere; postcentral gyrus; right hemisphere of cerebellum; skin of thigh; ganglionic eminence; pons; right lobe of liver; tibia / Top expressed in: Region I of hippocampus proper; otolith organ; utricle; paraventricular nucleus of hypothalamus; dorsomedial hypothalamic nucleus; zygote; ventral tegmental area; supraoptic nucleus; arcuate nucleus; lateral hypothalamus; More reference expression data
BioGPS	More reference expression data
Gene ontology
Molecular function	protein binding; transcription coactivator activity
Cellular component	nBAF complex; nuclear body; chromosome, centromeric region; kinetochore; chromosome; nucleus; cytosol
Biological process	positive regulation of transcription, DNA-templated; dendrite development; positive regulation of dendrite morphogenesis; regulation of dendrite development; regulation of transcription, DNA-templated; transcription, DNA-templated; chromatin organization; positive regulation of transcription by RNA polymerase II
Sources:Amigo / QuickGO
Orthologs
Databases	NCBI: entry; OMA: entry
Species	Human	Mouse
Entrez	26039	269397
Ensembl	ENSG00000184402	ENSMUSG00000039086
UniProt	O75177	Q8BW22
RefSeq (mRNA)	NM_001301778; NM_015558; NM_198935	NM_178750
RefSeq (protein)	NP_001288707; NP_945173	NP_848865
Location (UCSC)	Chr 20: 62.14 – 62.18 Mb	Chr 2: 179.68 – 179.71 Mb
PubMed search
- Wikidata
View/Edit Human	View/Edit Mouse

SS18-like protein 1 is a protein that in humans is encoded by the SS18L1 gene.

== Function ==
Synovial sarcomas occur most frequently in the extremities around large joints. More than 90% of cases have a recurrent and specific chromosomal translocation, t(X;18)(p11.2;q11.2), in which the 5-prime end of the SS18 gene is fused in-frame to the 3-prime end of the SSX1, SSX2, or SSX4 gene. The SS18L1 gene is homologous to SS18.

== Interactions ==
SS18L1 has been shown to interact with CREB-binding protein. Biochemical pull down assays reveal SS18L1 to interact with several components of the human SWI/SNF chromatin remodeling complex.
