= Tumour surveillance theory =

Immune system theory

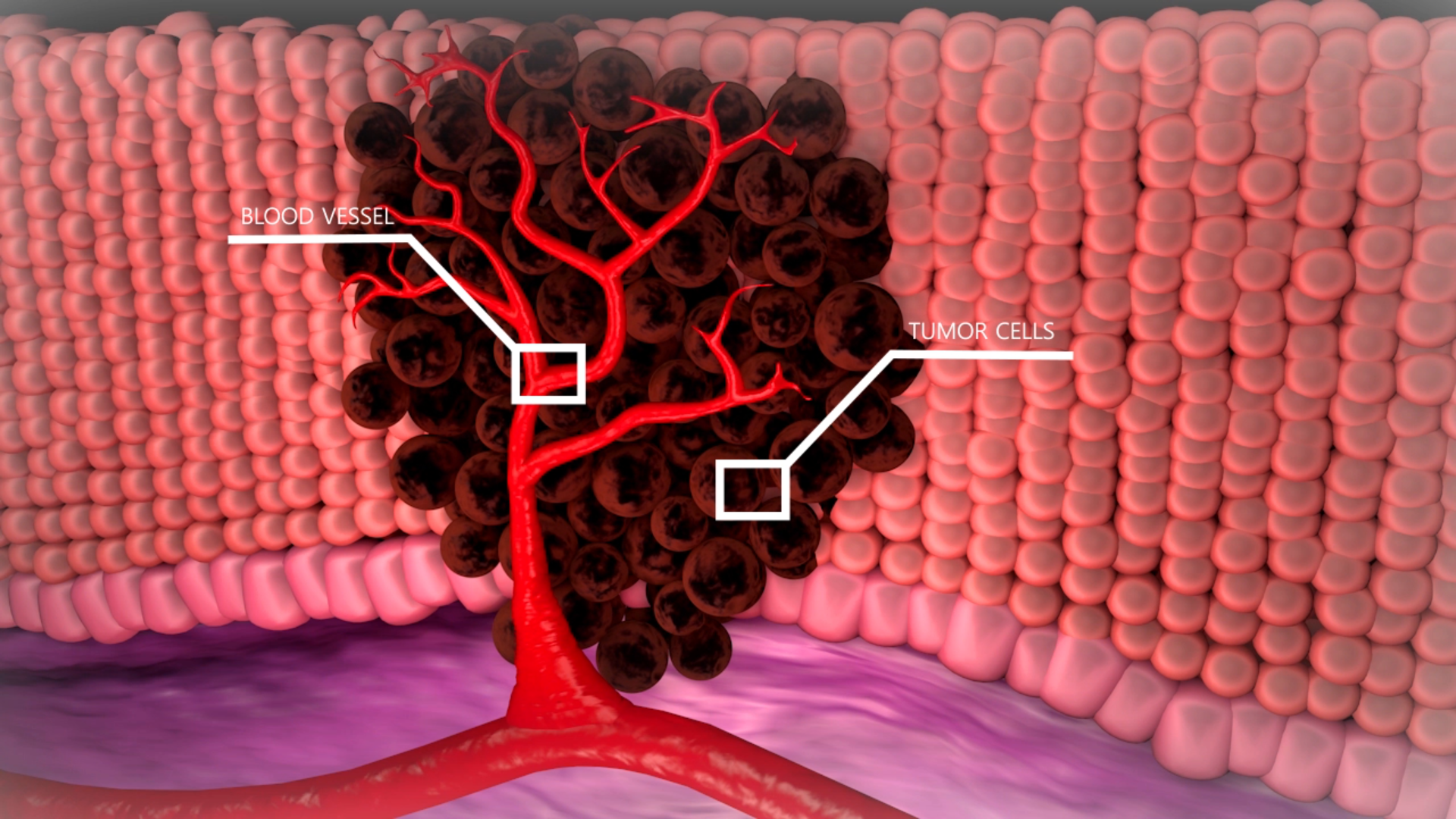
An illustration of a tumour growing, what tumour immunosurveillance would target.

Tumour surveillance theory, also known as tumour immunosurveillance, is a proposed mechanism that the immune system can recognise and destroy neoplastic cells by recognising neoantigens. The theory was first formulated by Lewis Thomas and Sir Frank Mac Farlane Burnet. Upon recognition of these antigens by immune cells, including NK cells and T cells, serial events are triggered to eliminate the abnormal cells through different mechanisms of these immune cells. This prevents the growth and progression of neoplasms, or tumours.

Research shows evidence supporting the theory using the results of mice immune systems attacking tumour cells without destroying normal tissue, and longer survival time found in patients with higher amounts of lymphocytes. Evidence against the theory is also present as immunocompromised mice modelling suggests there is no impact on cancer risk, other observations in mice might not translate into humans either.

Alternative theories have also been raised alongside the possibility that multiple mechanisms interact with each other in cancer control, providing future direction in research. With more experimental work focusing on this area, the theory builds a foundation for new cancer markers, antibodies, the basis of cancer immunotherapy.

== History and development of the theory ==
In 1909, Paul Ehrlich proposed a mechanism of the immune system in eradicating aberrant cells, preventing them from developing into tumours. During the mid-20th century, scientists found experimental evidence supporting the immune system's ability to suppress tumours. This included Ludwik Gross's first findings on the immune response stimulation against sarcoma in mice in 1953, as well as E.J. Foley's research on tumours induced by methylcholantrene in that same year. The tumour surveillance theory, developed in the late 1950s by Lewis Thomas and Sir Frank MacFarlane Burnet, emerged from these findings. Thomas and Burnet hypothesised that the immune system can recognise tumour-specific neoantigens expressed on tumour cells and eliminate newly arising tumours.

In 2002, Gavin P. Dunn and Robert D. Schreiber introduced the concept of immunoediting to highlight the connection between the immune system and cancer formation. Immunoediting consists of three phases: elimination, equilibrium, and escape. Elimination presents the core of the tumour surveillance theory where the immune system actively destroys tumour cells. During the equilibrium phase, tumours remain dormant, balancing between elimination and progression. Once the tumours evade the immune system and reach the third phase, they become clinically detectable.

== Cancer immunosurveillance mechanism ==
According to the theory, the detection and subsequent elimination of neoplastic cells are built on the functions of several immune cells and mediators. The mechanisms underlying immunosurveillance can be categorised as follows:

=== NK cells ===
Natural Killer (NK) cells, derived from lymphoid progenitor cells, are innate immune cells. NK cells can identify and eliminate cells without requiring previous exposure to their antigens, thereby protecting against infectious pathogens and tumourigenic mutations with the following mechanisms.

==== By releasing cytotoxic granules ====
NK cells release cytotoxic granules containing perforins and granzymes. The glycoprotein, perforin, is responsible for creating pores in target cell membranes, allowing the entry of the serine protease called granzyme. This entry triggers the apoptosis of the target cells. Additionally, cytokines for cell signalling released by NK cells, including tumour necrosis factor alpha (TNFα) and interferon-gamma (IFNγ), subsequently inducing cell destruction.

An illustration of the IgG antibody structure. On this structure, there is a fragment antigen-binding (Fab) portion that binds to neoantigens and an Fc fragment that binds to the FcγR on the effector cells.

==== By antibody-dependent cellular cytotoxicity (ADCC) ====
Antibody-dependent cellular cytotoxicity (ADCC), an immune response to the target cells, is dependent on three components: the antigens presented on the target cells, the antibodies, and the Fc-gamma receptors (FcγRs) expressed on the immune effector cells that respond to stimuli. When these three form a complex, ADCC is triggered to recognise the target cells and initiate a lytic response by the effector cells.

NK cells are considered key effector cells triggering ADCC. Since NK cells only possess activating FcγR but not inhibitory ones, NK cells interact more effectively with the IgG antibodies than the other effector cell lineages.

=== T cells ===
T cells, including their subclasses of helper T cells (CD4+) and cytotoxic T cells (CD8+), are fundamental lymphocytes in adaptive immunity. Their anti-cancer functions are captured in the cancer-immunity cycle.

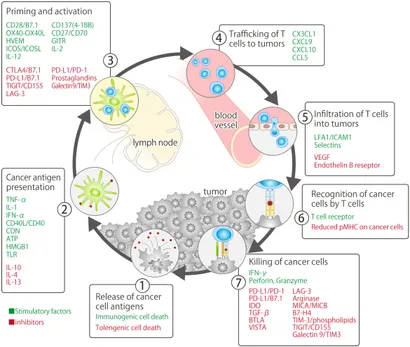
An overview of the cancer-immunity cycle involving APCs, tumour-specific antigens, and naive then activated T cells.

Cancer-immunity cycle

1. When normal cells become cancer cells, they release tumour-specific antigens.
2. Antigen-presenting cells (APCs) and dendritic cells recognise and capture these antigens.
3. APCs present the antigens to activate the naive (inactive) T cells in lymph nodes.
4. Activated T cells travel through the blood vessels towards the tumour sites.
5. In the tumour microenvironment (TME), T cells infiltrate the tumour and stroma.
6. T cells recognise the tumour antigens and bind to them.
7. Cytotoxic action is triggered to kill the targeted cancer cells. Upon destruction of these cells, new antigens are released, resulting in another round of the cycle.

This cycle illustrates the importance of the activation of CD8+ for eliminating the tumour cells. Infiltration of TME by CD8+ improves cancer prognosis, and enables the prediction of many cancer developments.

=== Other mediators and effector cells ===
The functions of leukocytes in tumour surveillance depend on integrins. As a major integrin expressed in lymphocytes, Lymphocyte Function-Associated Antigen 1 (LFA-1) enables the activation, migration, and adhesion of immune cells. By interacting with its main ligand, ICAM-1, LFA-1 mediates the cancer-immunity cycle. Tumours that disrupt these functions of LFA-1 may escape from immunosurveillance, leading to cancer progression.

In the TME, B cells are also capable of recognising antigens, serving as APCs that interact with and signal the activation of other immune cells. Inflammatory cytokines released by B cells also promote the recruitment of immune cells.

The antibody production ability of B cells is another potential mechanism in removing tumour cells. Upon activation of naive B cells when presented with tumour antigens, they proliferate and differentiate into plasma cells (PCs). These cells produce tumour-specific IgG-type antibodies, inducing the ADCC response in NK cells and T cells.

== Evidence for and against the theory ==
=== Supporting evidence ===
In transplantation mice models when tumours were transplanted into syngeneic hosts, hosts with the same genetic material, the tumour was rejected and attacked by the immune system. However, when normal tissue was transplanted, it was accepted by the hosts, this suggests the presence of tumour-specific antigens that the immune system recognises. Regulatory T cells (Tregs) can also recognise tumour antigens and interact with APCs via joint action with major histocompatibility complex (MHC) to regulate immune activity. Additionally, a decline in immunosurveillance capacity and increased accumulation of senescent cells as individuals age could explain the interplay between ageing and cancer development.

A longer survival time has also been observed in patients of various tumour types including melanoma, breast, bladder, prostate, and others when more lymphocytes and NK cells were present and circulating in their body. This would corroborate the theory as well since APCs process and present neoantigens to immune cells, generating memory cells that can recognise and subsequently destroy tumour cells. Similarly, NK cells were able to attack tumour cells without previously being exposed to the cells from specific tumours.

Furthermore, research has found that in non-metastatic colorectal cancer patients, detecting circulating tumour cells (CTCs) was related to aggressive disease progression and reduced survival. While not directly addressing immunosurveillance, it demonstrates how detrimental it is when tumour cells evade immune detection. The immune evasion ability of tumour cells is supported by observations of TME inflammatory cells escaping the immune system and contributing to tumour growth in head and neck cancers.

=== Opposing evidence ===
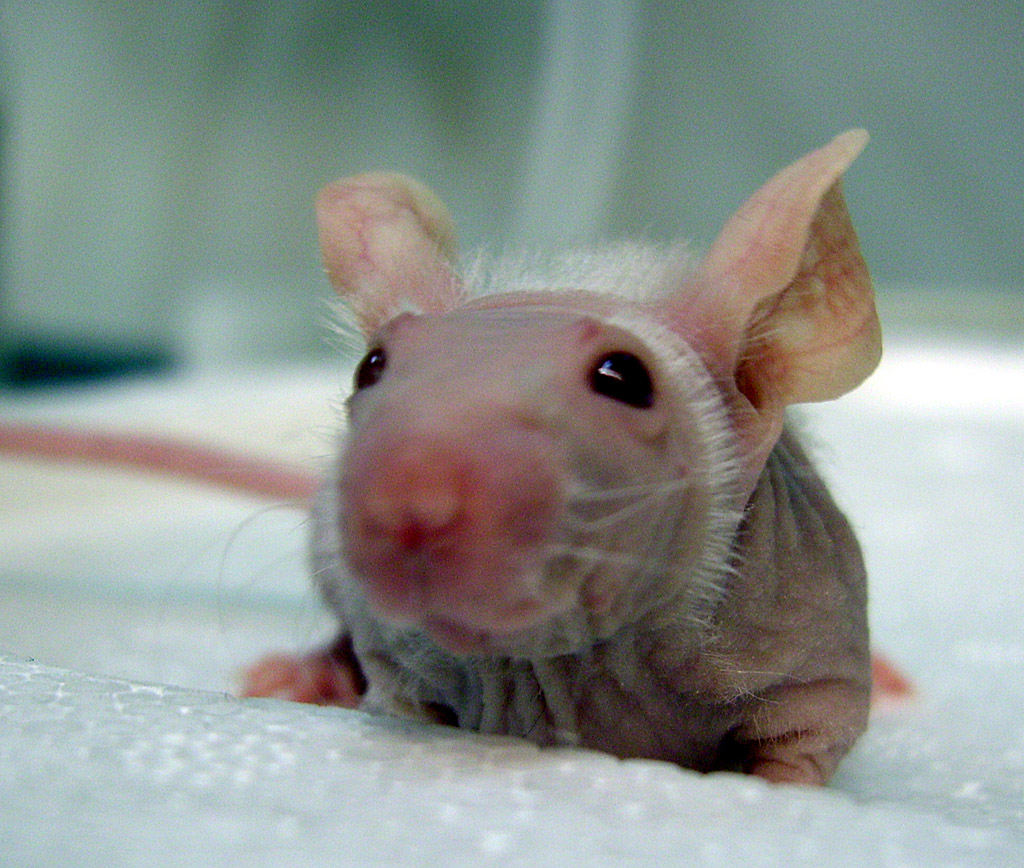
An athymic nude mouse.

In athymic nude mice, mice without T cells, more tumour growth in the absence of immunosurveillance regulation would be expected if the tumour surveillance theory is valid. However, they do not have more methylcholantrene-induced tumours than regular mice. Immunosuppression also may not be associated with an increase in tumours. A thymectomy at birth reduces the amount of circulating T cells, yet mammary adenocarcinoma incidence decreases. Conditions like leprosy and sarcoidosis which cause immunosuppression are also not associated with increased tumour occurrence.

Interferon-gamma (IFNγ) and perforin from NK cells both have functions in tumour formation prevention in mice, therefore, mice without IFNγ were more prone to methylcholantherene-induced oncogenesis. Yet, treatments with IFNγ did not help human patients with different tumour types, indicating that immunosurveillance effects observed in mice may not be present in humans. Though perforin managed to inhibit B cell lymphoma development, this may also be a result of underlying gene mutation encoding perforin that is associated with its pathology rather than evidence of immunosurveillance.

== Alternative theories ==
There are some alternative theories suggested to tumour immunosurveillance. They include non-immune surveillance mechanisms and integrated surveillance models.

Non-immune surveillance mechanisms, not involving the immune system unlike tumour immunosurveillance, include genetic, intercellular and intracellular, and epigenetic surveillance. Deficiencies in genetic surveillance that typically detects and corrects DNA damage by nucleotide excision repair (NER) and checkpoint kinases might lead to increased cancer risk. Gene mutations in TP53 might also enable malignant growth by inhibiting apoptosis and cell-cycle events. Malfunction of intercellular surveillance involves non-immune stromal cells in TME that recruit immunosuppressive cells or promote tumour growth by adrenergic stimulation; dysregulating apoptotic pathways. Epigenetic surveillance encompasses DNA methylation and histone modification processes, changes in chromatin can cause oncogenes to be activated and tumour suppressors silenced in expression.

Whereas integrated surveillance models are based on the synergistic effects of immune and non-immune mechanisms. DNA repair deficiencies combined with immune evasion, or epigenetic dysregulation with TME alterations. The interaction of genetic and intracellular surveillance may also pose cancer risks.

These theories demonstrate how cancer involves a network of mechanisms both immune and non-immune, and the control of oncogenesis is not as simple as the consideration of tumour surveillance theory alone.

== Clinical implications ==
=== Cancer markers ===
Immunosurveillance is considered important in controlling tumour growth while they proliferate and mutate to become less antigenic. If the theory is true, understanding cancer cells' mechanisms for evading the immune system and being able to locate them would be crucial to preventing cancer progression or to use as a cancer marker. The presence of tumour-infiltrating lymphocytes (TILs) and specific immune markers can also serve as prognostic indicators in various cancers, such as melanoma and colorectal carcinoma.

=== Anti-tumour antibodies ===
While the mechanisms that cause the production of anti-tumour antibodies are still unclear, cellular and humoral immune responses against neoantigens have been recorded to produce antibodies in cancer patients. However, some of the antibodies do not have functional relevance and are simply markers of exposure. These antibodies may be useful for detecting cancer early and post-treatment monitoring for cancer recurrence. They might also reveal information about the subtypes of cancer and their characteristics for specific therapies to be developed.

=== Cancer immunotherapies ===
In modern medicine, there are already immunotherapies developed and being developed for cancer. Cancer immunotherapies are administered by injecting anti-tumour antibodies into patients and are designed to reactivate or enhance the body's immunosurveillance mechanism to target cancer cells and overcome tumour cells' immune evasion. The main immunotherapy currently used as standard of care and most developed is monoclonal antibody therapy (mAb), such as trastuzumab or panitumumab and more. Monoclonal antibodies can inhibit immune checkpoints that were incorrectly stimulated by cancers to attack normal cells, activate the immune system, inhibit tumour growth, or deliver cytotoxic agents. It is a highly specific treatment that can be tailored to patients but there are still challenges including resistance and high costs.

Other therapies include engineered TCR T therapy that takes patients' T cells and differentiates them to recognise specific cancer antigens. CAR-T cell therapy works similarly by adding a synthetic chimeric antigen receptor (CAR) to trigger tumour-specific immune responses. NK cell therapy mediates anti-tumour effects by expressing CARs as well. Multispecific antibodies are also emerging as a new approach for more complex immune-evading cancers.

Although the existing identified biomarkers are insufficient for treatment due to tumour heterogeneity resulting in some patients responding well to cancer immunotherapies while others do not, further research into tumour immunology and immunotherapy shows promise in improving immunotherapies, patient outcomes, and reducing adverse events.
