= Ectopic expression =

Genetic information manifested elsewhere

Ectopic is a word used with a prefix ecto-, meaning "out of", and the suffix -topic, meaning "place." Ectopic expression is an abnormal gene expression in a cell type, tissue type, or developmental stage in which the gene is not usually expressed. The term ectopic expression is predominantly used in studies using metazoans, especially in Drosophila melanogaster for research purposes.

== How is it used ==
Although ectopic expression can be caused by a natural condition, it is uncommonly seen in nature because it is a product of defects in gene regulation. In fact, ectopic expression is more commonly used for research purposes. Artificially induced gene expression helps to determine the function of a gene of interest. Common techniques such as overexpressing or misexpressing the genes by UAS-Gal4 system in D. melanogaster are used. In model organisms, such techniques are used to perform genetic screens to identify a function of the gene involved in specific cellular or developmental processes.

Ectopic expression using these techniques is a useful tool because phenotypes induced in a tissue or cell type where they are not normally expressed are easily distinguishable compared to a tissue or cell type where the gene is normally expressed. By comparison with its basal expression, the function of a gene of interest can be identified.

Although the understanding of ectopic expression deals with endogenous genes in an organism, it can be expanded to a similar concept like transgenesis, where an exogenous gene is introduced to a cell or tissue type in which the gene is not usually expressed. The use of ectopic expression in biological science is not only limited to identifying functions of a gene in a known cell or tissue type but also used to discover unknown or additional functions of the gene.

== Research examples ==
=== Paired box protein ===
Paired box protein Pax-6 in humans is a transcription factor, which is a main regulatory gene of eye and brain development. Ectopic expression of Drosophila homolog eyeless (ey) has been used to identify roles of Pax-6 in humans. Using tissue specific UAS-Gal4 system, ey can be induced on the legs, wings, halters and antennae of the transgenic flies to demonstrate that functions of ey.

=== Olfactory receptor genes ===
Olfactory receptor gene (OR) is normally expressed in human and mouse olfactory tissue with a main function as odorant receptor for the detection of odorants. Individuals with a defect in this gene have disorders of taste and smell. It has been reported that ORs is also expressed on sperms and testis with special emphasis in a manner of ectopic expression. In a study, researchers identified ectopic expression of OR genes in non-olfactory tissues in the mouse model by measuring transcript levels. Here they found relatively low OR gene expression compared to the olfactory tissue, which result indicates that the OR gene in other tissue have no extra function, but they suggest that there is a possibility that small OR subsets can have functional roles in different tissue.

=== Synovial Sarcoma X chromosome breakpoint-2 ===
Synovial Sarcoma X chromosome breakpoint-2 (SSX2) proteins are known to localize in nucleus and work as a transcriptional repressor. In addition, expression of SSX2 is frequently observed in melanoma, but the role of the gene has not been evaluated. Thus, researchers have used the principle of ectopic expression to express SSX2 to different cell lines including cancer model cells. They found important phenotypes of ectopic SSX2 expression that is involved in tumorigenesis: 1) immediate induction of genomic instability, 2) long-term support of tumor cell growth.
