= Bunch of grapes sign =

Bunch of grapes sign, also written bunch-of-grapes sign, is a descriptive term in radiology for the appearance of multiple small, clustered cystic spaces on medical imaging. It has been applied to several conditions.

- Bunch of grapes sign (uterus), in hydatidiform mole, where swollen chorionic villi form a uterine mass of many small cysts on ultrasound
- Bunch of grapes sign (pancreas), in intraductal papillary mucinous neoplasm of the pancreas, in which dilated side branches form a cluster of small cysts
- Bunch of grapes sign (kidney), in multicystic dysplastic kidney, where multiple non-communicating cysts give the kidney a grape-like cluster
- Bunch of grapes sign (lung), in bronchiectasis, where dilated cystic bronchi lying close together appear as clustered thin-walled cysts on chest imaging
- Bunch of grapes sign (soft tissue), in botryoid rhabdomyosarcoma, a polypoid tumour whose grape-like surface underlies the older name sarcoma botryoides

== See also ==
- Bowl of grapes sign, a similarly named term for the cystic appearance of synovial sarcoma
