= Adaptimmune =

American biopharmaceutical startup

Adaptimmune Therapeutics PLC
- Company type: Public
- Traded as: Expert Market: ADAPY
- Industry: Biotechnology; Pharmaceutical; Cancer immunotherapy
- Founded: 2008; 18 years ago
- Headquarters: Philadelphia, U.S.
- Key people: George Robinson
- Website: adaptimmune.com

Adaptimmune is a biopharmaceutical company that develops T cell therapies against cancer. The company was founded in 2008 in the UK with links to both Oxford University and the University of Pennsylvania. It has headquarters in Philadelphia and Milton Park.

In August 2024, the US Food and Drug Administration granted accelerated approval to Adaptimmune's Tecelra, a therapy against a rare form of cancer. Tecelra is the first T cell therapy to be approved for use against a solid tumor. In January 2025, the FDA granted breakthrough therapy designation to Adaptimmune's Letetresgene Autoleucel (lete-cel) for Treatment of Myxoid/Round Cell Liposarcoma (MRCLS).

In July 2025, Adaptimmune announced their entry into a Definitive Agreement for Sale of Tecelra, lete-cel, and the pre-clinical uza-cel to US WorldMeds for $55M.
