= Cellular adoptive immunotherapy =

Immunotherapy using T cells

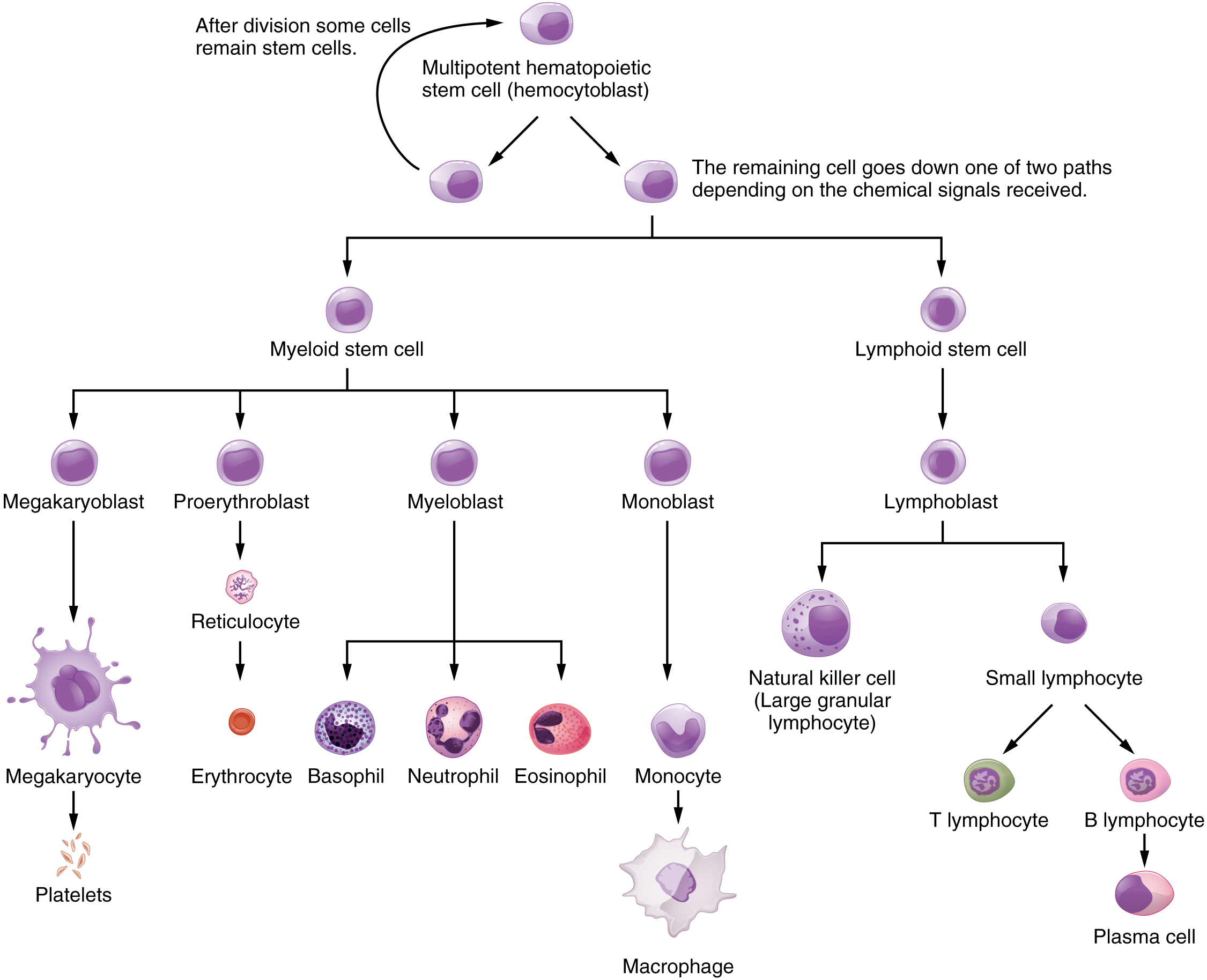
Immune cell lineage

Cellular adoptive immunotherapy is a type of immunotherapy. Immune cells such as T cells are usually isolated from patients for expansion or engineering purposes and reinfused back into patients to fight diseases using their own immune system. A major application of cellular adoptive therapy is cancer treatment, as the immune system plays a vital role in the development and growth of cancer. The primary types of cellular adoptive immunotherapies are T cell therapies. Other therapies include CAR-T therapy, CAR-NK therapy, macrophage-based immunotherapy and dendritic cell therapy.

== History ==
Although immunotherapy with immune checkpoint blockade and targeted therapy was used to treat and improve the survival of patients with several types of cancers, such as non-small cell lung cancer, many patients still develop disease progression even after receiving these therapies. Cellular adoptive therapy is another alternative for these patients. The first studies with tumor-infiltrating lymphocytes (TILs) were performed at the Surgery Branch in the National Institutes of Health. These studies used TILs grown from different murine tumors and showed in vivo anti-tumor activity of these cells. Current cellular adoptive therapies consist of the ex-vivo expansion of TILs from resected tumors and transferred back to the patients' bodies with support of interleukin -2 (IL–2). This treatment has been shown to be effective in tumors such as metastatic melanoma.

== T cell therapies ==
=== Tumor-Infiltrating Lymphocyte (TIL) Therapy ===
Although T cells are powerful tools that help us defend against cancer through immune responses, errors may still occur during the process, and cancer's anti-tumour effect may vary. For example, the T cells may not be activated and sustain the anti-tumor effect long enough, or the number of T cells presented is insufficient. TIL therapy isolates tumor-infiltrating lymphocytes (TILs), which are naturally occurring T cells in cancer patients that have already recognised cancer cells and infiltrated into the tumor as an anti-tumor response from their own immune system after tumor resection. These isolated cells will then be cultured with interleukin-2 and tested to choose cells with high tumor recognition or selected through the "young TIL" approach. Selected cells are activated and rapidly expanded, then re-infused back into the patient.

==== Melanoma ====
Melanoma was the first type of tumor that provided insight into cancer immunotherapy due to its high immunogenicity. TIL therapy has been shown to be one of the most effective methods against metastatic melanoma.

==== Other solid tumors ====
Apart from melanoma, TIL therapy can also be applied to other solid tumors. The presence of TILs has been considered an important factor for predicting clinical outcome and prognosis of cancer patients with different types of tumors such as Head and neck squamous cell carcinoma (A type of head and neck cancer), ovarian cancer, and renal cell carcinoma (RCC). However, previous clinical trials of TIL therapy on patients with ovarian cancer and renal cell carcinoma have only shown mixed results and modest success respectively.

==== Advantages ====
TILs in TIL therapy were exposed and stimulated by tumor antigens before isolation. These tumors often express chemokine receptors and combine with the tumor-specific T cell receptors presented on them. This makes it easier for the TILs to target tumor cells after being re-infused. Off-target toxicity was also rarely reported in TIL therapy.

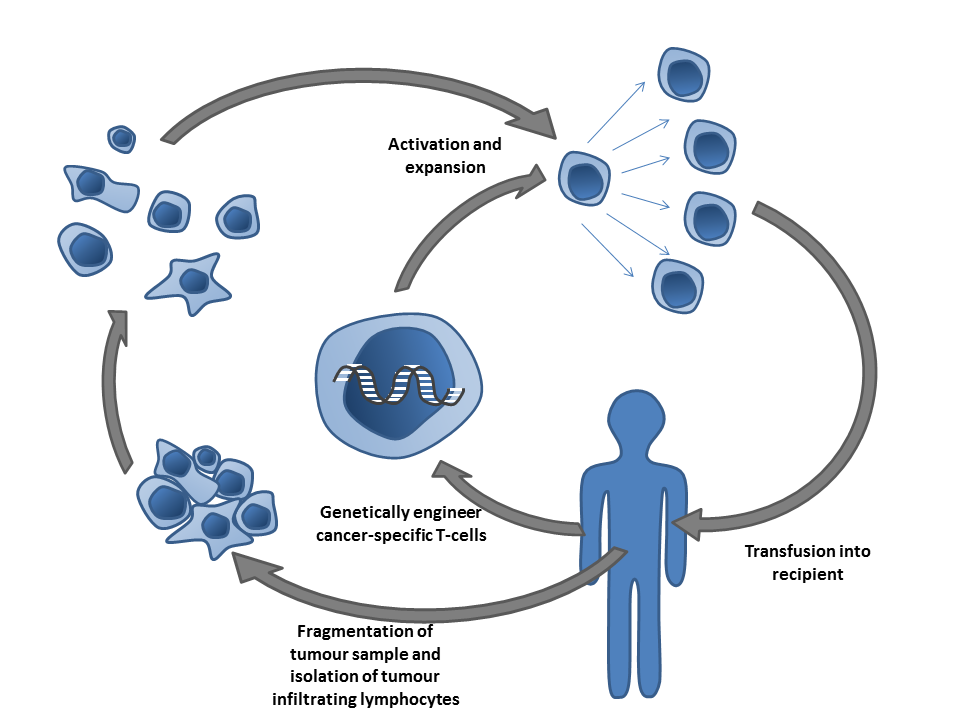
A flowchart illustrating the procedure of tumor-infiltrating lymphocyte (TIL) therapy and engineered T cell receptor (TCR) therapy.

==== Challenges ====
1) TIL therapy needs to overcome the heterogeneity of solid tumors, which adds difficulty to the identification of a target for all tumor cells.

2) Achieving full function of T cells and tumor microenvironment (TME) with different immunosuppressive mechanisms is another primary concern.

=== Engineered T Cell Receptor (TCR) Therapy ===
TCR therapy has a similar principle as TIL therapy. However, TCR therapy isolates peripheral blood T cells and engineers them to target tumor tissues. This therapy has shown to be more effective in treating solid tumors than other cellular adoptive immunotherapies such as CAR T cell therapy.

==== Challenges ====
Manufacturing	The production of TCR T cells requires complex processes with strict monitoring. Moreover, the cost of the manufacturing process is expensive. Cost of single infusions of axicabtagene ciloleucel: US$373,000 Tisagenlecleucel: US$475,000
T cell	Efficacy of treatment highly depends on whether infused cells can persist within patients. Increasing the T - cell persistence has been a major challenge and direction for TCR therapy.
Tumor microenvironment	Tumor microenvironments are usually immunosuppressive. They attract immunosuppressive cells and promote cancer cell survival. Thus, making it difficult for T - cells to perform anti-tumor functions.

=== Chimeric Antigen Receptor (CAR) T Cell Therapy ===
Chimeric antigen receptor T cells (CAR-T) are predominantly used in cancer immunotherapy. T cells are harvested from patients' bodies and infused after genetic engineering (equipped with CAR construct). And the currently developing mRNA vaccine technology may provide the possibility for in vivo CAR induction in the future.

==== Applications ====
The major application of CAR-T immunotherapy is to treat hematological malignancies, such as multiple myeloma, chronic lymphocytic leukemia, acute lymphoblastic leukemia and lymphoma. Also, CAR-T-related solid tumor treatments have become increasingly promising due to protein and cell engineering improvements.

===== Hematological malignancies =====
====== Acute lymphoblastic leukemia (ALL) ======
Anti-CD19 (CD19 is crucial for B cell lineage, which is overexpressed on leukemic B-cells) is the most commonly used and effective CAR in ALL treatments. Many clinical studies have reported its efficacy with satisfying complete and partial remission rates (CR and PR). Besides anti-CD19, other potential candidates include anti-CD20 and immunoglobulin light chains. Further suggestions from clinical trials such as controlled CD4+ and CD8+ CAR-T could be potential strategies to investigate factors relevant to the drug efficacy, adverse effects, etc.

====== Other hematological malignancies ======
Targeting different biomarkers can treat chronic lymphocytic leukemia, lymphoma and multiple myeloma.

===== Solid tumors =====
Potential treatments for melanoma, breast cancer and sarcoma are still in the research phase. The challenges for CAR-T therapy to achieve efficacy and recent development and improvement will be discussed in the limitation and recent advances and future improvement section.

==== Side effects ====
===== Neurological complications =====
Confusion, delirium and occasional seizures and cerebral edema are observed as adverse effects of anti-CD19 CAR-T, which still lack well-explained pathogenesis [3]. Furthermore, the immune effector cell-associated neurotoxicity can cause death occasionally. Some hypothesized causes such as endothelial cell activation and the increase of blood-brain barrier permeability are still under investigation. Nakinra, an anti-IL-1R antibody, has exhibited an anti-neurotoxicity effect on CAR-T treated murine model.

===== Cytokine release syndrome (CRS) =====
Hemophagocytic lymphohistiocytosis, macrophage activation syndrome, and CRS are common side effects after CAR-T treatment.

Main articles: Cytokine release syndrome; chimeric antigen receptor T cell.

===== IgE-mediated anaphylactic reaction =====
CAR derived from humanized mice or human antibodies might still be recognized as a foreign antigen and be attacked by patients' immune systems, causing IgE-mediated anaphylactic responses.

==== Advantages ====
CAR-T therapy exhibits distinct specificity compared to other adaptive immunotherapies and traditional cancer treatments such as chemotherapy. CAR-T kill tumor cells specifically by targeting the tumor-associated antigens to keep the damage to healthy tissue at a minimum level. Additionally, these engineered T cells can perform their function independent from HLA - major histocompatibility complex (MHC) presentation. Furthermore, CAR structure can be manipulated flexibly to target different antigens, which greatly promises the extension of its application.

==== Limitations ====
1) In order to achieve complete remission, the production of CAR-T cells, the infusion process, and the effectiveness of the tumor-killing effect must all be successfully carried out. Sometimes, it can be difficult to collect enough T cells from a patient, the CAR-T cells may fail to multiply in the lab or in the body, or the CAR-T cells may not remain effective for long periods. These issues can lead to a failure to achieve long-lasting remissions. 2) Therapy efficacy may be limited by antigen modulation, specifically antigen down-regulation when infused back into patients' bodies, leading to frequent disease relapse. 3) Toxicity and adverse events. 4) CAR-T treatment efficacy and safety are greatly reduced because of solid tumors' immunosuppressive microenvironment and the lack of distinct tumor antigen as the target.

==== Recent advances and future improvements ====
CAR structure is continuously developing from the first generation to the fourth, improving cell expansion, efficacy, and persistence.

== Other therapies ==
=== CAR-NK therapy ===
Natural killer cells belong to the innate immune system, while they perform anti-tumor functions in a very similar mechanism to CD8+ cytotoxic T cells. CAR-NK provides new perspectives in the cancer immunotherapy field after the advancement of CAR-T therapy.

==== Advantages ====
1. Improved safety: mitigated cytokine release syndrome, neurotoxicity and graft-versus-host response compared to CAR-T therapy.
2. Multiple activation mechanisms: can perform cytotoxic activity both CAR-dependently and CAR-independently.
3. "off-the-shelf" potential.

==== Limitations ====
The lack of an efficient way for gene transduction is the major limitation of CAR-NK therapy. Although retroviral vectors exhibit up to 70% efficiency with the presence of membrane-bound cytokines, it would bring problems such as insertional mutagenesis and reduced NK viability. While lentivirus transduction generally causes lower genotoxicity but with lower transfection efficiency.

=== Dendritic cell therapy ===
Main article: see Cancer immunotherapy

== Prospects ==
The final destination of cellular adoptive therapies is to create cellular products that are personalized and specific to each patient's tumor - hopefully creating products that can target different tumors in cancer patients. The future direction of cellular adoptive therapies focuses on improving anti-tumor effects of the therapies and reducing toxicity.

=== For T - cell therapies ===
Increasing the reactivity of TIL towards tumor antigen through CD137 or PD-1 is a possible direction of treatment improvement. Gene editing on TILs by genetic editing tools such as Zinc finger nucleases to decrease PD-1 expression on TILs is another way to improve the efficacy of TIL therapy.

Another major challenge to tackle is to reduce the 'on target, off tumor' toxicity of TCR therapy. Antigens presented only on the tumor, but not in the healthy tissue should be identified to decrease the chance of TCRs targeting healthy tissue. Side effects should also be reduced by techniques such as tumor reduction prior to therapy and dose adaptive strategies.

=== For chimeric antigen receptor related therapies ===
Besides the structural development of CAR constructs, the mRNA vaccine could provide a novel platform for CAR delivery and induction in vivo. Recently, the COVID-19 mRNA vaccine was approved by the FDA, which is lipid nanoparticle loaded. If the mRNA delivery strategy is applied to cellular adoptive therapy, the manufacture of CAR immune cells could be more time-efficient and cost-effective. It means cancer patients with aggressive tumor exacerbation could be saved in time. Moreover, the currently expensive immunotherapies would be more affordable to the general public.
