= HLF =

HLF may refer to:

- HLF (gene), Hepatic Leukemia Factor - a human gene and the protein encoded by it
- Hapag-Lloyd Flug, former German airline, ICAO code
- Herbalife, US MLM company, NYSE symbol
- Heritage Lottery Fund, a British grant-giving organisation
- Hillfoot railway station, in Scotland
- Hiram Leong Fong, former United States Senator from Hawaii
- Histoire littéraire de la France, a history of French literature
- Holy Land Foundation for Relief and Development, an American Islamic charity
- Huddersfield Literature Festival, in England
- Hultsfred Airport, in Sweden
- Hyderabad Literary Festival, in India
