= SSX4 =

SSX4 can refer to:

- SSX on Tour, a skiing and snowboarding video game
- SSX4 (gene), the gene that encodes Protein SSX4
