= Pseudodiploid =

Pseudodiploid or pseudoploid can have multiple different meanings:

- In viral reproduction, it means having two RNA genomes per virion but giving rise to only one DNA copy in infected cells.
- The term may refer to cells that are diploid, but have chromosomal translocations.
- Finally, a pseudo-diploid may be a diploid sequence generated in silico consisting of a haploid of an individual and that of another.

== Virology ==
Retrovirions for example are considered pseudoploid – they have two genomes within each capsid, but in general only one provirus is seen after infection with a single virion.

Retrovirus particles contain two copies of the RNA genome held together by multiple regions of base pairing (strongest pairing at 5’ ends) which is also called 70S complex (dimer of 35S genomes). This gives viruses evolutionary advantages such as the ability to survive extensive damage to their genomes, as at least parts of both genomes are used during the reverse transcription process. It also explains the high rates of genetic recombination in retroviruses. The retroviral genome is coated by a viral nucleocapsid protein that may function like a single stranded binding protein and therefore enhances processivity and facilitates template exchanges. The nucleocapsid first organizes RNA genomes within the virion and then facilitates reverse transcription within the infected cell.
