= Bowl of grapes sign =

Radiological sign in synovial sarcoma

MRI scan of synovial sarcoma

The bowl of grapes sign is a descriptive radiological term used in the context of synovial sarcoma, a malignant soft tissue tumor. This sign refers to the appearance of multiple small, rounded, fluid-containing spaces within a soft tissue mass, which resemble a cluster of grapes. These cystic spaces are typically attributed to hemorrhage, necrosis, or myxoid degeneration within the tumor, a common feature of synovial sarcoma.

== Radiological features ==
The bowl of grapes sign is typically identified on magnetic resonance imaging and computed tomography, and occasionally on ultrasound. During ultrasound examination, mixed echogenicity is noted in synovial sarcoma, with hypoechoic or anechoic areas corresponding to the cystic regions.

The cystic spaces in synovial sarcoma appear hyperintense on T2-weighted images, reflecting fluid content. Solid tumor components often demonstrate heterogeneous enhancement after contrast administration. The mass may display a multilocular appearance with well-defined cystic and solid regions, contributing to the grape-like pattern.
