= Synovial sarcoma, X breakpoint =

Group of genes affected in some cancers

Synovial sarcoma, X breakpoint (SSX) is a group of genes rearranged in synovial sarcoma.

They include:

- SSX1
- SSX2 and SSX2B
- SSX3
- SSX4 and SSX4B
- SSX5
- SSX6
- SSX7
- SSX8
- SSX9
- SSX10

The group also has several associated pseudogenes, and the interacting protein SSX2IP.

The translocation t(X;18) creates a fusion of the SYT gene(at 18q11) with either SSX1 or SSX2 (both at Xp11). Neither SYT, nor the SSX proteins contain DNA-binding domains. Instead, they appear to be transcriptional regulators whose actions are mediated primarily through protein–protein interactions, with BRM in the case of SYT, and with Polycomb group repressors in the case of SSX.
