= Afamitresgene autoleucel =

Gene therapy medication

Clinical data
- Trade names: Tecelra
- Other names: MAGE-A4C1032T
- AHFS/Drugs.com: Monograph
- License data: US DailyMed: Afamitresgene autoleucel
- Routes of administration: Intravenous infusion
- ATC code: None

Legal status
- Legal status: US: ℞-only

Identifiers
- UNII: CUY18BJ7BP
- KEGG: D12951

Afamitresgene autoleucel, sold under the brand name Tecelra is a T cell immunotherapy used for the treatment of synovial sarcoma. It is a T cell receptor (TCR) gene therapy. It is administered as a single intravenous dose.

The most common adverse reactions include cytokine release syndrome, nausea, vomiting, fatigue, infections, pyrexia, constipation, dyspnea, abdominal pain, non-cardiac chest pain, decreased appetite, tachycardia, back pain, hypotension, diarrhea, and edema.

Afamitresgene autoleucel was approved for medical use in the United States in August 2024. Afamitresgene autoleucel is the first T cell receptor (TCR) gene therapy approved by the US Food and Drug Administration (FDA).

== Medical uses ==
Afamitresgene autoleucel is a melanoma-associated antigen A4 (MAGE-A4)-directed genetically modified autologous T cell immunotherapy indicated for the treatment of adults with unresectable or metastatic synovial sarcoma who have received prior chemotherapy, are HLA-A*02:01P, -A*02:02P, -A*02:03P, or -A*02:06P positive and whose tumor expresses the MAGE-A4 antigen as determined by FDA-approved or cleared companion diagnostic devices.

Afamitresgene autoleucel is an autologous T cell immunotherapy composed of a recipient's own T cells. T cells in afamitresgene autoleucel are modified to express a T cell receptor that targets MAGE-A4, an antigen (substance that normally triggers the immune system) expressed by cancer cells in synovial sarcoma.

== Adverse effects ==
The US Food and Drug Administration (FDA) prescribing information includes a boxed warning for serious or fatal cytokine release syndrome, which may be severe or life-threatening.

The most common adverse reactions include cytokine release syndrome, nausea, vomiting, fatigue, infections, pyrexia, constipation, dyspnea, abdominal pain, non-cardiac chest pain, decreased appetite, tachycardia, back pain, hypotension, diarrhea, and edema. The most common grade 3 or 4 laboratory abnormalities include lymphocyte count decreased, neutrophil count decreased, white cell blood count decreased, red blood cell decreased, and platelet count decreased.

Recipients may also exhibit immune effector cell-associated neurotoxicity syndrome (ICANS), an immune system-related syndrome that can occur following some immunotherapies, infections, secondary malignancies, or hypersensitivity reactions, and severe cytopenia (an abnormally low level of blood cells) for several weeks following lymphodepleting chemotherapy and infusion of afamitresgene autoleucel.

== History ==
The safety and effectiveness of afamitresgene autoleucel was evaluated in SPEARHEAD-1, cohort 1, a multicenter, single-arm, open-label clinical trial that enrolled HLA-A*02:01-03 and 06 allele positive participants with inoperable or metastatic synovial sarcoma who had received prior systemic therapy with either doxorubicin and/or ifosfamide and whose tumor expressed the MAGE-A4 tumor antigen. Participants received lymphodepleting chemotherapy with fludarabine and cyclophosphamide. Fifty-two participants with synovial sarcoma were enrolled and underwent leukapheresis, eight of whom did not receive afamitresgene autoleucel due to death (n=3), loss of eligibility prior to lymphodepleting chemotherapy (n=3), withdrawal by patient (n=1), and investigator decision (n=1). Forty-five participants received lymphodepletion and one patient withdrew consent before treatment, for a total of 44 participants who received a single infusion of afamitresgene autoleucel. Effectiveness was evaluated based on overall response rate and the duration of response to treatment with afamitresgene autoleucel. Among the 44 participants in the trial who received afamitresgene autoleucel, the overall response rate was 43.2% and the median duration of response was six months.

== Society and culture ==
=== Legal status ===
Afamitresgene autoleucel was approved for medical use in the United States under the accelerated approval pathway in August 2024. The FDA granted the application for afamitresgene autoleucel regenerative medicine advanced therapy, priority review, and orphan drug designations. The FDA granted the approval of Tecelra to Adaptimmune, LLC.

=== Names ===
Afamitresgene autoleucel is the international nonproprietary name.
