= T cell receptor T cell therapy =

Type of cancer immunotherapy

T cell receptor T cell therapy (TCR-T) is a type of adoptive T-cell therapy that targets some cancers. TCR-T therapies are based on the use and redirection of the T cell receptor (TCR) against specific antigen of interest such as a tumor antigens. TCRs are heterodimers made of alpha and beta peptide chains to recognize MHC-presented polypeptide fragment molecules. Unlike CAR-T, which uses cell surface antigens, TCR-T can recognize MHC's larger set of intracellular antigen fragments. However, TCR-T cell therapy depends on MHC molecules, limiting its usefulness.

Each T cell's TCR is specific to one antigen and sits on the T cell's surface. The affinity of human TCRs to tumor antigens is relatively low, rendering them unable to recognize and kill tumor cells effectively. The modified T cell has much higher affinity, which enhances both recognition and affinity supporting the recognition of tumor cells.

== History ==
Michael Steinmetz was the first to move TCR genes across T cells. The recipient T cell then recognized a different antigen, enabling the use of these cells to target non-surface antigens.

One clinical trial modified multiple amino acids, increasing the T cell's affinity for New York esophageal squamous cell carcinoma (NY-ESO-1). This TCR was used to attack NY-ESO-1-overexpressing cancers, such as multiple myeloma. 80% of multiple myeloma patients had at least a good clinical response, and 70% had complete or near-complete response.

In 2024, the US Food and Drug Administration approved afamitresgene autoleucel (Tecelra) as the first TCR-T therapy for the treatment of synovial sarcoma.

== Process ==
Appropriate target antigens are identified by substraction. First the entire set of antigens presented by tumor cells is identified. Next, those presented by normal cells are screened out, leaving only those unique to the tumorous cells. Then a TCR phage display library is used to pick TCRs with high affinity and specificity. A preclinical safety test watches for off-target effects and cross-reactivity.

Certain studies have shown that TCR clones can also be identified from a Tumor-infiltrating lymphocytes (TILs) or other T cell clones from patients. Isolated T cell clones are then selected based on their reactivity against specific cell types. TCR can then be sequenced and a DNA construct can be designed based on this sequence. DNA construct can then be virally transduced or electroporated in T cells to lead to the desired TCR expression in order to rewire T cells against wanted cell types.

Challenges include target selection, TCR identification, affinity screening, safety, time, and cost.

Most targets are limited by MHC class.

== Side effects ==
Hybridization (mismatch) between exogenous and endogenous chains may induce harmful recognition of autoantigens, triggering graft-vs.-host disease. Increased affinity poses a risk of false targeting.

== Target malignancies ==
Malignant myelomas appear qualified, but the appropriate epitopes have not been identified. Published studies and their target antigens include:

- Acute myeloid leukemia (WT1)

Solid tumors:

In solid tumors local injection is more effective than systemic drug administration, such as injecting T cells into the cerebrospinal fluid in brain tumors. Published studies include:

- Esophageal cancer (MAGE-E4)
- Metastatic colorectal cancer (TGFβII)
- Metastatic melanoma (Gp100)
- Metastatic/malignant melanoma (MAGE-A3)
- Metastatic melanoma (MART-1)
- Metastatic melanova/synovial cell carcinoma (NY-ESO-1)
- Multiple myeloma (NY-ESO-1)
