= DbCRID =

dbCRID

Content
- Description: chromosomal rearrangements in human diseases.
- Organisms: Homo sapiens

Contact
- Laboratory: Biolead.org Research Group, LC Science
- Authors: Fanlou Kong
- Primary citation: Kong & al. (2011)
- Release date: 2010

Access
- Website: http://dbCRID.biolead.org

The Chromosomal Rearrangements In Diseases (dbCRID) is a database of human chromosome rearrangements events and diseases related to them.

== See also ==
- Chromosome rearrangements
