= Checkpoint kinase =

Checkpoint kinase may refer to:

- CHEK1, a protein kinase that is encoded by the CHEK1 gene
- CHEK2, a tumor suppressor gene that encodes the CHK2 kinase
