= Chromosomal translocation =

Phenomenon that results in unusual rearrangement of an chromosomes

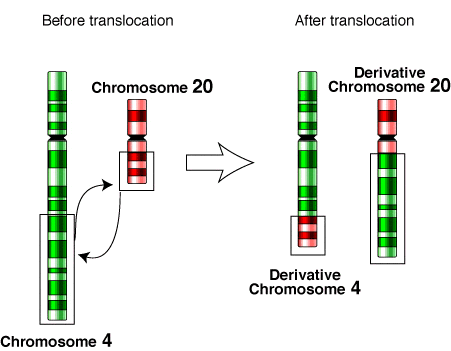
Chromosomal reciprocal translocation of the 4th and 20th chromosome.

In genetics, chromosome translocation is a phenomenon that results in unusual rearrangement of chromosomes. This includes "balanced" and "unbalanced" translocation, with three main types: "reciprocal", "nonreciprocal" and "Robertsonian" translocation. Reciprocal translocation is a chromosome abnormality caused by exchange of parts between non-homologous chromosomes. Two detached fragments of two different chromosomes are switched. Robertsonian translocation occurs when two non-homologous chromosomes get attached, meaning that given two healthy pairs of chromosomes, one of each pair "sticks" and blends together homogeneously. Each type of chromosomal translocation can result in disorders for growth, function and the development of an individual's body, often resulting from a change in their genome.

A gene fusion may be created when the translocation joins two otherwise-separated genes. It is detected on cytogenetics or a karyotype of affected cells. Translocations can be balanced (in an even exchange of material with no genetic information extra or missing, and ideally full functionality) or unbalanced (in which the exchange of chromosome material is unequal resulting in extra or missing genes). Ultimately, these changes in chromosome structure can be due to deletions, duplications and inversions, and can result in 3 main kinds of structural changes.

== History ==
Chromosomal translocations – in which a segment of one chromosome breaks off and attaches to another – were first observed in the early 20th century. In 1916, American zoologist William R. B. Robertson documented a chromosomal fusion in grasshoppers (now known as a Robertsonian translocation). In 1938, Karl Sax demonstrated that X-ray irradiation could induce chromosomal translocations, observing radiation-induced fusions between different chromosomes in plant cells. During the 1940s, Barbara McClintock's maize cytogenetics experiments revealed the breakage–fusion–bridge cycle of chromosomes, further illuminating mechanisms of chromosomal rearrangement. A major breakthrough came in 1960 with the discovery of the Philadelphia chromosome in chronic myelogenous leukemia – the first consistent chromosomal abnormality linked to a human cancer. In 1973, Janet Rowley identified the Philadelphia chromosome as a translocation between chromosomes 9 and 22, definitively linking a specific chromosomal translocation to leukemia.

In subsequent decades, technological advances greatly enhanced the detection and understanding of translocations. The introduction of chromosome banding techniques in the 1970s (e.g. Q-banding and G-banding) allowed more precise identification of individual chromosomes and their abnormalities in karyotypes. The development of fluorescence in situ hybridization (FISH) in the early 1980s enabled researchers to label specific DNA sequences with fluorescent probes on chromosomes, dramatically improving the mapping of translocation breakpoints. In the 21st century, high-throughput DNA sequencing (such as whole-genome sequencing) has made it possible to detect translocations at single-nucleotide resolution, leading to the discovery of numerous previously undetected translocations across different cancers and genetic disorders.

== Balanced reciprocal translocations ==
Reciprocal translocations involve an exchange of material between non-homologous chromosomes. Such translocations are usually harmless, as they do not result in a gain or loss of genetic material, as is the case with nonreciprocal translocations. This type of translocation is often caused by erroneous repair of double stranded breaks or non-homologous crossing over in meiosis.

A common balanced reciprocal translocation is the exchange of material between chromosome 11 and 22. Individuals with this chromosomal abnormality do not experience any phenotypic effects but are subject to issues with fertility since carriers of balanced reciprocal translocations may create gametes with unbalanced reciprocal or nonreciprocal chromosome translocations. The combination of the carrier's gamete with the wild type gamete from the other parent may result in duplication or deletion of genetic material based on segregation of chromosomes during meiosis. This can lead to infertility, miscarriages or children with abnormalities. Genetic counselling and genetic testing are often offered to families that may carry a translocation. A common example of a birth defect that may result from the carrier of the translocation mentioned above is Emanuel syndrome.

== Unbalanced reciprocal translocations ==
Unbalanced reciprocal translocations are similar to balanced reciprocal translocations in that they involve the exchange of genetic information between two non-homologous chromosomes. However, with unbalanced reciprocal translocations, the process results in the duplication or deletion of some genetic material as well. Since there is a genetic imbalance, individuals with an unbalanced reciprocal translocation will often exhibit phenotype reflective of the abnormal gene expression.

Most unbalanced reciprocal translocations are a result of inheritance from a parent with a balanced translocation. As mentioned previously, parents with balanced translocations are likely to give birth to children with unbalanced translocations. Although less common, unbalanced translocations may form due to errors during gametogenesis or errors in repair of double stranded DNA breaks.

== Nonreciprocal translocation ==
Nonreciprocal translocation is a chromosomal abnormality that involves the one-way transfer of genes from one chromosome to another non-homologous chromosome. This transfer will always be unbalanced resulting in genetic imbalance. This excess or deletion of genetic material compared to a normal genome is likely to result in disease.

Nonreciprocal translocations can occur as a result of three main processes. Errors during DNA replication, unequal crossing over in meiosis or mitosis and/or exogenous factors causing double stranded DNA damage. When a chromosome experiences a double strand break at one or more locations it may rejoin to a non-homologous chromosome. In the case of nonreciprocal translocations, the acceptor chromosome gains material but the donor chromosome does not accept material in exchange. This unequal transfer causes loss of genetic material which may have varying degrees of impact.

A number of factors affect the impact of the translocation. The segment of the chromosome affected by the double strand break may be in a coding or noncoding region. Therefore, the rearrangement may result in a number of affects to the gene. Essential genes may be silenced or oncogenes may be activated. The chromosome on which the translocation occurs may also affect the result due to certain chromosomes containing more essential genes. Which cell type the translocation occurs in may also have an affect. Somatic cells are more likely to result in cancer, where germ line cells are more likely to result in birth defects including miscarriages and still births.

One specific example of an unbalanced nonreciprocal translocation is Emanuel Syndrome. At the chromosomal level, a fragment from chromosome 11 is non-reciprocally translocated to chromosome 22 creating genetic imbalances. Phenotypically, Emanuel Syndrome presents as neurological and physical developmental disorders, microcephaly, and congenital defects.

== Robertsonian translocations ==
Robertsonian translocation is a type of translocation caused by breaks at or near the centromeres of two acrocentric chromosomes. The reciprocal exchange of parts gives rise to one large metacentric chromosome and one extremely small chromosome that may be lost from the organism with little effect because it contains few genes. The resulting karyotype in humans leaves only 45 chromosomes, since two chromosomes have fused together. This has no direct effect on the phenotype, since the only genes on the short arms of acrocentrics are common to all of them and are present in variable copy number (nucleolar organiser genes).

Robertsonian translocations have been seen involving all combinations of acrocentric chromosomes. The most common translocation in humans involves chromosomes 13 and 14 and is seen in about 0.97 / 1000 newborns. Carriers of Robertsonian translocations are not associated with any phenotypic abnormalities, but there is a risk of unbalanced gametes that lead to miscarriages or abnormal offspring. For example, carriers of Robertsonian translocations involving chromosome 21 have a higher risk of having a child with Down syndrome. This is known as a 'translocation Downs'. This is due to a mis-segregation (nondisjunction) during gametogenesis. The mother has a higher (10%) risk of transmission than the father (1%). Robertsonian translocations involving chromosome 14 also carry a slight risk of uniparental disomy 14 due to trisomy rescue.

== Chromosomal structural changes ==
Changes in chromosome structure can be due to deletions, duplications and inversions, ultimately resulting in 3 main kinds of structural changes.

Isochromosomes result when a chromosome has two identical arms, such as two P or two Q arms, instead of the expected Q and P pairing. These isochromosomal structural changes can result in a loss of information, as well as a change in expression within the body due to the duplication of one set of chromosomal arms.

Dicentric chromosomes are chromosomes with two centromeres, resulting in an instability within the chromosome and a loss of genetic information due to the fusion of two chromosome pieces with a centromere. This results in a singular chromosome having two centromeres, due to the fusion of two chromosomal pieces with one centromere each, therefore resulting in the fusion of two centromeres.

Ring chromosomes are chromosomes that form when the ends of the previous chromosomes break off to form a circular structure. This results in a loss of genetic material as well as the potential loss of the chromosomal centromere.

== DNA double-strand breaks with translocations ==
The initiating event in the formation of a translocation is generally a double-strand break in chromosomal DNA. Double stranded breaks in chromosomal DNA can occur for many reasons, however a major role in generating these translocations is the non-homologous end joining (NHEJ) pathway. When this pathway functions appropriately, it restores a DNA double-strand break by reconnecting the originally broken ends using their sticky or blunt ends that have been generated by the enzyme and protein machinery. However, when the NHEJ pathway acts inappropriately, it may join ends incorrectly, therefore resulting in genomic rearrangements including translocations. These incorrect combinations are the result of sequences in close proximity that have similar homology, but not perfect homology, yet it is recognized by the repair machinery as perfect. This then leads the machinery to begin repairing using NHEJ with the wrong sequences, resulting in deletions and insertions of specific nucleotides, or the joining of incorrect end sequences. Ultimately, these issues arise due to a misread of the homologous sequences by the protein or enzyme machinery, and leads to the mis-incorporation of incorrect sequences into the genome. when the genomes of slightly homologous sequences are in too close of proximity, resulting in the machinery becoming confused or mistaking the wrong sequence for the correct one.

Another influence in generating DNA double stranded break translocations is through the creation of AID translocations. These sequences are the result of a deamination procedure of a cytosine nucleotide into a uracil nucleotide. This change ultimately results in a mismatch between the complementary sequence and its target sequence, therefore resulting in a translocation. When further processed by specific endonucleases, this uracil leads to a mutation or a double stranded break. Once again, these double stranded break and the mismatch that occurred lead to a translocation of the genomic sequence, which in turn have effect on the chromosome the DNA is present on.

Finally, new information is surfacing regarding the influence of exogenous rare-cutting endonucleases on DNA double stranded breaks and their resulting chromosomal translocations. Specifically, during DNA double strand break repair, reflections of misjoining of exchanged sequence ends have been noted, primarily due to the mishomology present by the NHEJ pathway. However, at these specific break points, additional nucleic acid and DNA sequence loss has been found, therefore leading to the conclusion that additional exogenous rare-cutting endonucleases are present at various locations on these strands. Each deletion results in a varying size, location or cut version, ultimately suggesting DNA degradation by endonucleases prior to NHEJ joining. Additional influences on DNA degradation similar to that of exogenous rare-cutting endonucleases has also been noted as a result of cytotoxic chemotherapy, ionizing radiation, although further research is needed in order to provide more conclusive and viable answers.

Overall, through various mechanisms, DNA double-strand breaks and sources of DNA double-strand break repair are able to generate both reciprocal and non reciprocal chromosomal translocations. Such DNA breaks and repair mechanisms are also able to generate gross chromosomal mutations, inclusive of not only translocations, but also inversions, amplifications and simple deletions, all resulting in null or dangerous transformations.

== Role in disease ==
Chromosomal translocations can cause a diverse array of diseases, mutations or other heritable changes within an individuals genomes. Often, these mutations are caused by the loss of genetic information resulting from a structural change in the chromosome. There are three main forms of structural changes, and each of these has a role within the creation of disease. Whether it be from the structural changes themselves, or directly from the loss of genetic information, many varying diseases or mutations can be acquired due to chromosomal translocations.

A prevalent and dangerous disease resulting from chromosomal translocations is Cancer. There are several forms of cancer that are caused by acquired translocations, many of them falling within the classifications of leukemia, acute myelogenous leukemia, and chronic myelogenous leukemia, with additional translation classifications being detected within solid malignancies such as Ewing's sarcoma. Regardless of the cancer classification, the most common process for generation of these cancers is through the disruption or misregulation of normal gene function. This results in the molecular rearrangement of the genes necessary for proper gene regulation, therefore resulting in cancer formation. An alternative way that such cancers can be formed is through the fusion of coding sequences. This fusion results from the translation forcing the generation of a ring or iso chromosome, or from DNA end joining due to a close proximity between homologues genes, therefore creating a potent, fused oncogene.

Infertility is also a prevalent and common form of disease that is generated by chromosomal translocations, and often can be asymptomatic or symptomatic within fetuses. Commonly influenced by one of the parents being a carrier for a balanced translocation yet being asymptomatic, the offspring often acquire additional mutations prior to birth resulting in the effect and symptomatic response due to the presence of the translocation within their genome. Ultimately, this symptomatic response is discovered when homology between two individuals genomes results in the loss of genetic information from the asymptomatic chromosomal translocation becoming problematic.

In addition, the inheritance of Down syndrome can be caused by chromosomal translocations. In a minority (approximately 3 - 4%) of Down syndrome syndrome cases, the cause for this mutation is that of a Robertsonian translocation of chromosomes. This results from the Robertsonian translocation of the chromosome 21 long arm, onto the long arm of chromosome 14. These translocations can also occur onto other chromsomes, such as chromosome 13, 15, or 22 resulting in these chromosomes also being referred to as Robertsonian chromosomes. Regardless of where, the result is a loss of information on chromosome 21 genes, and an addition of genetic information on the altering chromosome.

Finally, chromosomal translocations between the sex chromosomes can also result in a number of genetic conditions, such as XX male syndrome, which is caused by a translocation of the SRY gene from the Y to the X chromosome. Alternatively, additional genetic diseases can also be a result of chromosomal translocations, such as Emmanuel syndrome, Klinfelter syndrome and Turner syndrome.

== By chromosome ==
Overview of some chromosomal translocations involved in different cancers, as well as implicated in some other conditions, e.g. schizophrenia, with chromosomes arranged in standard karyogram order. Abbreviations: ALL – Acute lymphoblastic leukemia AML – Acute myeloid leukemia CML – Chronic myelogenous leukemia DFSP – Dermatofibrosarcoma protuberans

Human karyotype with annotated bands and sub-bands as used for the nomenclature of chromosomal abnormalities. It shows dark and white regions as seen on G banding. Each row is vertically aligned at centromere level. It shows 22 homologous autosomal chromosome pairs as well as both the female (XX) and male (XY) versions of the two sex chromosomes.

=== Denotation ===
The International System for Human Cytogenetic Nomenclature (ISCN) is used to denote a translocation between chromosomes. The designation "t(A;B)(p1;q2)" is used to denote a translocation between chromosome A and chromosome B. The information in the second set of parentheses, when given, gives the precise location within the chromosome for chromosomes A and B respectively—with p indicating the short arm of the chromosome, q indicating the long arm, and the numbers after p or q refers to regions, bands and sub-bands seen when staining the chromosome with a staining dye. See also the definition of a genetic locus.

The translocation is the mechanism that can cause a gene to move from one linkage group to another.

=== Examples of translocations on human chromosomes ===
Translocation	Associated diseases	Fused genes/proteins	
Translocation	Associated diseases	First	Second
t(8;14)(q24;q32)	Burkitt's lymphoma – occurs in ~70% of cases, places MYC under IGH enhancer control	c-myc on chromosome 8, gives the fusion protein lymphocyte-proliferative ability	IGH@ (immunoglobulin heavy locus) on chromosome 14, induces massive transcription of fusion protein
t(11;14)(q13;q32)	Mantle cell lymphoma – present in most cases	cyclin D1 on chromosome 11, gives fusion protein cell-proliferative ability	IGH@ (immunoglobulin heavy locus) on chromosome 14, induces massive transcription of fusion protein
t(14;18)(q32;q21)	Follicular lymphoma (~90% of cases)	IGH@ (immunoglobulin heavy locus) on chromosome 14, induces massive transcription of fusion protein	Bcl-2 on chromosome 18, gives fusion protein anti-apoptotic abilities
t(10;(various))(q11;(various))	Papillary thyroid cancer	RET proto-oncogene on chromosome 10	PTC (Papillary Thyroid Cancer) – Placeholder for any of several other genes/proteins
t(2;3)(q13;p25)	Follicular thyroid cancer	PAX8 – paired box gene 8 on chromosome 2	PPARγ1 (peroxisome proliferator-activated receptor γ 1) on chromosome 3
t(8;21)(q22;q22)	Acute myeloblastic leukemia with maturation	ETO on chromosome 8	AML1 on chromosome 21 found in ~7% of new cases of AML, carries a favorable prognosis and predicts good response to cytosine arabinoside therapy
t(9;22)(q34;q11) Philadelphia chromosome	Chronic myelogenous leukemia (CML), acute lymphoblastic leukemia (ALL)	Abl1 gene on chromosome 9	BCR ("breakpoint cluster region" on chromosome 22
t(15;17)(q22;q21)	Acute promyelocytic leukemia	PML protein on chromosome 15	RAR-α on chromosome 17 persistent laboratory detection of the PML-RARA transcript is strong predictor of relapse
t(12;15)(p13;q25)	Acute myeloid leukemia, congenital fibrosarcoma, secretory breast carcinoma, mammary analogue secretory carcinoma of salivary glands, cellular variant of mesoblastic nephroma	TEL on chromosome 12	TrkC receptor on chromosome 15
t(9;12)(p24;p13)	CML, ALL	JAK on chromosome 9	TEL on chromosome 12
t(12;16)(q13;p11)	Myxoid liposarcoma	DDIT3 (formerly CHOP) on chromosome 12	FUS gene on chromosome 16
t(12;21)(p12;q22)	ALL	TEL on chromosome 12	AML1 on chromosome 21
t(11;18)(q21;q21)	MALT lymphoma	BIRC3 (API-2)	MLT
t(1;11)(q42.1;q14.3)	Schizophrenia (familial translocation disrupting DISC1)	DISC1 (1q42)	DISC1FP1 (11q14)
t(2;5)(p23;q35)	Anaplastic large cell lymphoma	ALK	NPM1
t(11;22)(q24;q11.2-12)	Ewing's sarcoma	FLI1	EWS
t(17;22)	DFSP	COL1A1/Collagen I on chromosome 17	Platelet derived growth factor B on chromosome 22
t(1;12)(q21;p13)	Acute myelogenous leukemia (rare subtype)	ETV6 (TEL, 12p13)	ARNT (1q21)
t(X;18)(p11.2;q11.2)	Synovial sarcoma - 90% of cases	SS18 (18q11)	SSX1/SSX2 (Xp11)
t(1;19)(q10;p10)	Oligodendroglioma and oligoastrocytoma	Associated with the 1p/19q co-deletion in oligodendroglioma and oligoastrocytoma, rather than a specific gene fusion	
t(17;19)(q22;p13)	Acute Lymphoblastic Leukemia very rare subtype, <1% of Acute Lymphoblastic Leukemia. (associated with poor prognosis)	TCF3 (E2A, 19p13)	HLF (17q22)
t(7,16) (q32-34;p11) or t(11,16) (p11;p11)	Low-grade fibromyxoid sarcoma – most cases	FUS (16p11)	CREB3L1 (11p11)

== See also ==
- Accipitridae
- Aneuploidy
- Chromosome abnormalities
- DbCRID
- Fusion gene
- Pseudodiploid
- Takifugu rubripes
