= HLF (gene) =

Protein-coding gene in the species Homo sapiens

Identifiers
- Aliases: HLF, PAR bZIP transcription factor, HLF transcription factor, PAR bZIP family member
- External IDs: OMIM: 142385; MGI: 96108; GeneCards: HLF

Gene location (Human)
Chr.	Chromosome 17 (human)
Band	17q22	Start	55,264,960 bp
Band	17q22	End	55,325,187 bp

Gene location (Mouse)
Chr.	Chromosome 11 (mouse)
Band	11 C|11 55.03 cM	Start	90,227,362 bp
Band	11 C|11 55.03 cM	End	90,281,721 bp
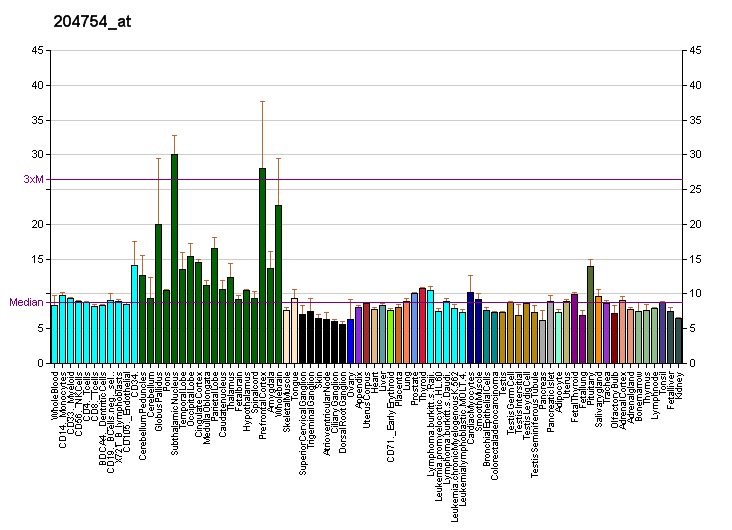

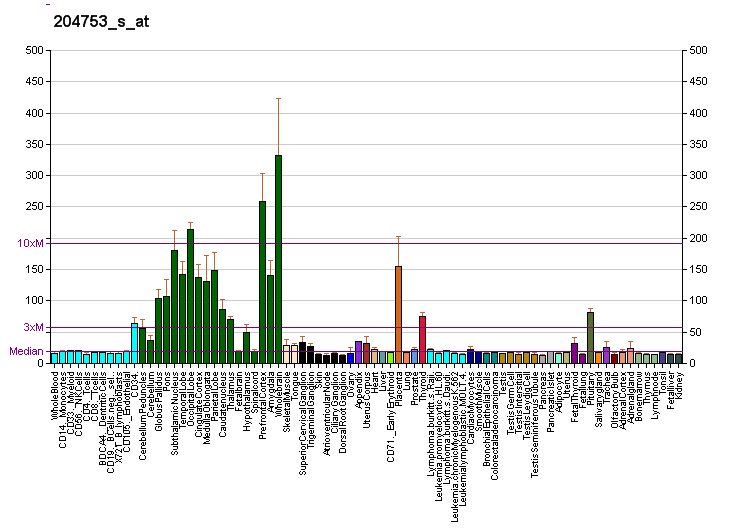

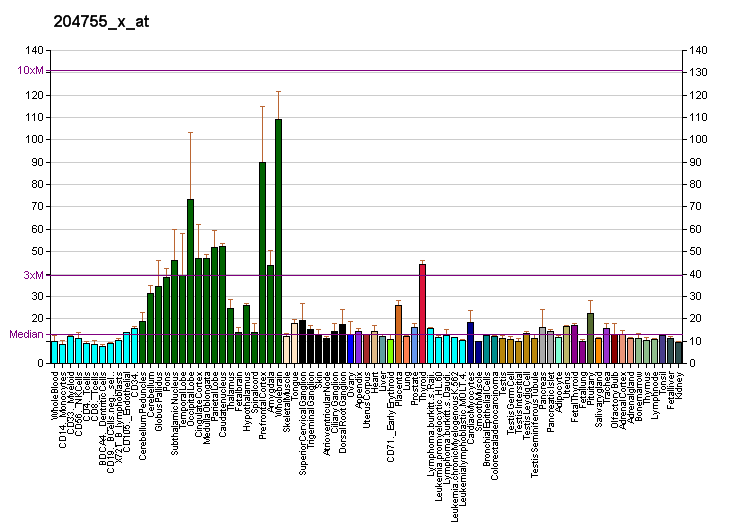
RNA expression pattern
Bgee	Human / Mouse (ortholog); Top expressed in: Achilles tendon; orbitofrontal cortex; Brodmann area 46; superior frontal gyrus; prefrontal cortex; middle temporal gyrus; postcentral gyrus; lateral nuclear group of thalamus; Brodmann area 23; Brodmann area 9 / Top expressed in: lateral geniculate nucleus; medial dorsal nucleus; inferior colliculi; medial geniculate nucleus; primary motor cortex; olfactory tubercle; mammillary body; pontine nuclei; median eminence; vestibular membrane of cochlear duct; More reference expression data
BioGPS	More reference expression data
Gene ontology
Molecular function	DNA-binding transcription factor activity; double-stranded DNA binding; RNA polymerase II transcription regulatory region sequence-specific DNA binding; DNA-binding transcription activator activity, RNA polymerase II-specific; DNA binding; sequence-specific DNA binding; DNA-binding transcription factor activity, RNA polymerase II-specific
Cellular component	nucleus
Biological process	multicellular organism development; skeletal muscle cell differentiation; regulation of transcription, DNA-templated; transcription by RNA polymerase II; transcription, DNA-templated; rhythmic process; positive regulation of transcription by RNA polymerase II; regulation of transcription by RNA polymerase II
Sources:Amigo / QuickGO
Orthologs
Databases	NCBI: entry; OMA: entry
Species	Human	Mouse
Entrez	3131	217082
Ensembl	ENSG00000108924	ENSMUSG00000003949
UniProt	Q16534	Q8BW74
RefSeq (mRNA)	NM_002126; NM_001330375	NM_172563
RefSeq (protein)	NP_001317304; NP_002117	NP_766151; NP_001390914; NP_001390915; NP_001390917; NP_001390918 NP_001390920; NP_001390922; NP_001390924; NP_001390926
Location (UCSC)	Chr 17: 55.26 – 55.33 Mb	Chr 11: 90.23 – 90.28 Mb
PubMed search
- Wikidata
View/Edit Human	View/Edit Mouse

Hepatic leukemia factor is a protein that in humans is encoded by the HLF gene.

== Function ==
This gene encodes a member of the proline and acidic-rich (PAR) protein family, a subset of the bZIP transcription factors. The encoded protein forms homodimers or heterodimers with other PAR family members and binds sequence-specific promoter elements to activate transcription. Chromosomal translocations fusing portions of this gene with the E2A gene cause a subset of childhood B-lineage acute lymphoid leukemias. Alternatively spliced transcript variants have been described, but their biological validity has not been determined.
