= SSX1 =

Protein-coding gene in the species Homo sapiens

Identifiers
- Aliases: SSX1, CT5.1, SSRC, synovial sarcoma, X breakpoint 1, SSX family member 1
- External IDs: OMIM: 312820; GeneCards: SSX1

Gene location (Human)
Chr.	X chromosome (human)
Band	Xp11.23	Start	48,255,392 bp
Band	Xp11.23	End	48,267,444 bp
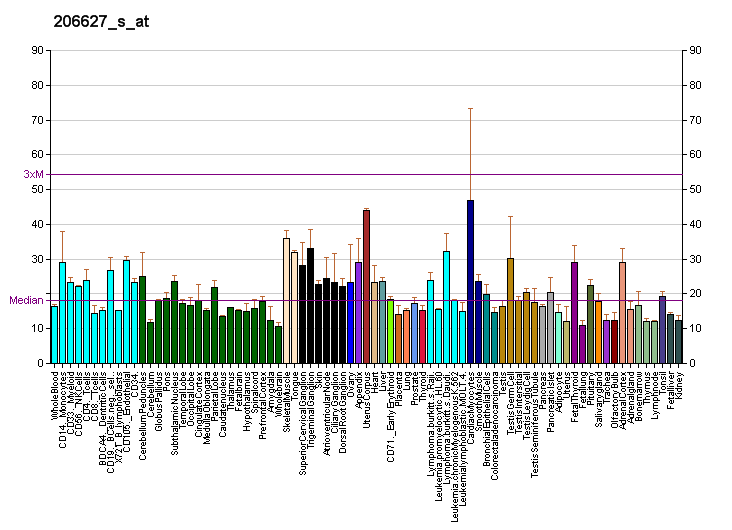
RNA expression pattern
Bgee	Human / Mouse (ortholog); Top expressed in: gonad; buccal mucosa cell; testicle; right testis; left testis; skin of thigh; fallopian tube; apex of heart; olfactory zone of nasal mucosa; pars reticulata / n/a; More reference expression data
BioGPS	More reference expression data
Gene ontology
Molecular function	protein binding; transcription corepressor activity; nucleic acid binding
Cellular component	intracellular anatomical structure; nucleus
Biological process	regulation of transcription, DNA-templated; transcription, DNA-templated; negative regulation of nucleic acid-templated transcription
Sources:Amigo / QuickGO
Orthologs
Databases	NCBI: entry; OMA: entry
Species	Human	Mouse
Entrez	6756	n/a
Ensembl	ENSG00000126752	n/a
UniProt	Q16384	n/a
RefSeq (mRNA)	NM_005635; NM_001278691	n/a
RefSeq (protein)	NP_001265620; NP_005626	n/a
Location (UCSC)	Chr X: 48.26 – 48.27 Mb	n/a
PubMed search		n/a
- Wikidata
View/Edit Human

Protein SSX1 is a protein that in humans is encoded by the SSX1 gene.

The product of this gene belongs to the family of highly homologous synovial sarcoma, X (SSX) breakpoint proteins. These proteins may function as transcriptional repressors. They are also capable of eliciting spontaneously humoral and cellular immune responses in cancer patients, and are potentially useful targets in cancer vaccine-based immunotherapy. SSX1, SSX2 and SSX4 genes have been involved in the t(X;18) chromosomal translocation characteristically found in all synovial sarcomas. This translocation results in the fusion of the synovial sarcoma translocation gene on chromosome 18 to one of the SSX genes on chromosome X. The encoded hybrid proteins are probably responsible for transforming activity.
