= SSX4 (gene) =

Protein-coding gene in the species Homo sapiens

Identifiers
- Aliases: SSX4, CT5.4, synovial sarcoma, X breakpoint 4, SSX family member 4
- External IDs: OMIM: 300326; MGI: 2446771; GeneCards: SSX4

Gene location (Human)
Chr.	X chromosome (human)
Band	Xp11.23	Start	48,383,516 bp
Band	Xp11.23	End	48,393,347 bp

Gene location (Mouse)
Chr.	X chromosome (mouse)
Band	X A1.1|X	Start	8,320,584 bp
Band	X A1.1|X	End	8,327,965 bp
RNA expression pattern
Bgee	Human / Mouse (ortholog); Top expressed in: testicle; gonad; right testis; left testis; olfactory zone of nasal mucosa; thoracic aorta; ascending aorta; tibial arteries; spleen; fallopian tube / Top expressed in: spermatid; testicle; embryo; spermatocyte; superior frontal gyrus; ovary; cerebellar cortex; primary visual cortex; lens; More reference expression data
BioGPS	n/a
Gene ontology
Molecular function	transcription corepressor activity; nucleic acid binding
Cellular component	intracellular anatomical structure; nucleus
Biological process	negative regulation of nucleic acid-templated transcription; regulation of transcription, DNA-templated; transcription, DNA-templated
Sources:Amigo / QuickGO
Orthologs
Databases	NCBI: entry; OMA: entry
Species	Human	Mouse
Entrez	6759	387132
Ensembl	ENSG00000268009	ENSMUSG00000023165
UniProt	O60224	n/a
RefSeq (mRNA)	NM_175729; NM_005636	NM_001001450; NM_001134226
RefSeq (protein)	NP_005627; NP_783856	n/a
Location (UCSC)	Chr X: 48.38 – 48.39 Mb	Chr X: 8.32 – 8.33 Mb
PubMed search
- Wikidata
View/Edit Human	View/Edit Mouse

Protein SSX4 is a protein that in humans is encoded by the SSX4 gene.

The product of this gene belongs to the family of highly homologous synovial sarcoma, X (SSX) breakpoint proteins. These proteins may function as transcriptional repressors. They are also capable of eliciting spontaneously humoral and cellular immune responses in cancer patients, and are potentially useful targets in cancer vaccine-based immunotherapy. SSX1, SSX2 and SSX4 genes have been involved in the t(X;18) chromosomal translocation characteristically found in all synovial sarcomas. This translocation results in the fusion of the synovial sarcoma translocation gene on chromosome 18 to one of the SSX genes on chromosome X. Chromosome Xp11 contains a segmental duplication resulting in two identical copies of synovial sarcoma, X breakpoint 4, SSX4 and SSX4B, in tail-to-tail orientation. This gene, SSX4, represents the more telomeric copy. Two transcript variants encoding distinct isoforms have been identified for this gene.
