= SSX2 =

Mammalian protein found in Homo sapiens

Identifiers
- Aliases: SSX2, CT5.2, CT5.2A, HD21, HOM-MEL-40, SSX, synovial sarcoma, X breakpoint 2, SSX family member 2
- External IDs: OMIM: 300192; GeneCards: SSX2

Gene location (Human)
Chr.	X chromosome (human)
Band	Xp11.22	Start	52,696,896 bp
Band	Xp11.22	End	52,707,178 bp
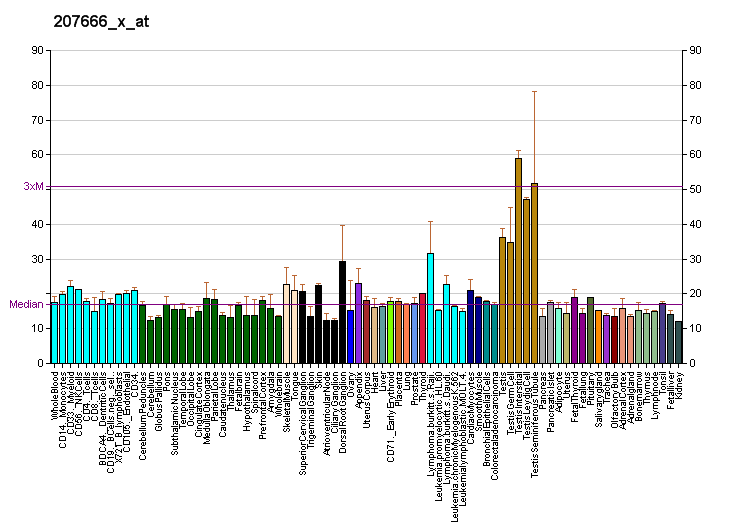

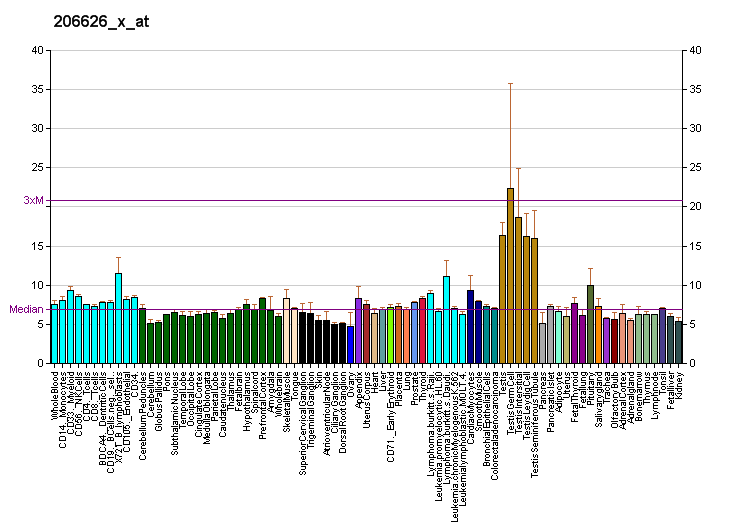

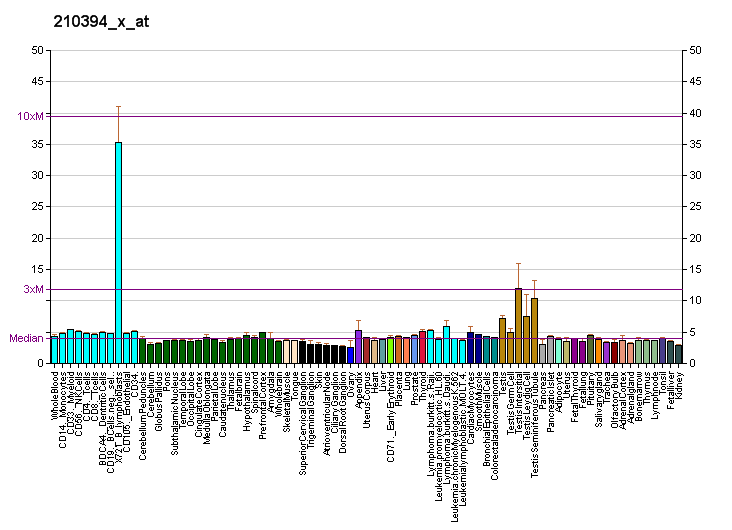
RNA expression pattern
Bgee	Human / Mouse (ortholog); Top expressed in: testicle; gonad; right testis; left testis; right lobe of thyroid gland; left lobe of thyroid gland; renal cortex; placenta; blood; left ventricle / n/a; More reference expression data
BioGPS	More reference expression data
Gene ontology
Molecular function	protein binding; transcription corepressor activity; nucleic acid binding
Cellular component	intracellular anatomical structure; nucleus
Biological process	negative regulation of nucleic acid-templated transcription; regulation of transcription, DNA-templated; transcription, DNA-templated
Sources:Amigo / QuickGO
Orthologs
Databases	NCBI: entry; OMA: entry
Species	Human	Mouse
Entrez	6757	n/a
Ensembl	ENSG00000241476	n/a
UniProt	Q16385	n/a
RefSeq (mRNA)	NM_175698; NM_001278697; NM_003147	n/a
RefSeq (protein)	NP_001157889; NP_001265630; NP_001265631	n/a
Location (UCSC)	Chr X: 52.7 – 52.71 Mb	n/a
PubMed search		n/a
- Wikidata
View/Edit Human

Protein SSX2 is a protein that in humans is encoded by the SSX2 gene. The gene SSX2 has a nearby identical duplicate SSX2B.

The product of this gene belongs to the family of highly homologous synovial sarcoma, X (SSX) breakpoint proteins. These proteins may function as transcriptional repressors. They are also capable of eliciting spontaneously humoral and cellular immune responses in cancer patients, and are potentially useful targets in cancer vaccine-based immunotherapy. SSX1, SSX2 and SSX4 genes have been involved in the t(X;18) chromosomal translocation characteristically found in all synovial sarcomas. This translocation results in the fusion of the synovial sarcoma translocation gene on chromosome 18 to one of the SSX genes on chromosome X. The encoded hybrid proteins are probably responsible for transforming activity. Two transcript variants encoding distinct isoforms have been identified for this gene.
