= FET protein family =

Family of RNA-binding proteins

The FET protein family (also known as the TET protein family) consists of three similarly structured and functioning proteins. They and the genes in the FET gene family which encode them (i.e. form the pre-messenger RNAs that are converted to the messenger RNAs responsible for their production) are: 1) the EWSR1 protein encoded by the EWSR1 gene (also termed the Ewing sarcoma RNA binding protein, EWS RNA binding protein 1, or bK984G1.4 gene) located at band 12.2 of the long (i.e. "q") arm of chromosome 22; 2) the FUS (i.e. fused in sarcoma) protein encoded by the FUS gene (also termed the FUS RNA binding protein, TLS, asTLS, ALS6, ETM4, FUS1, POMP75, altFUS, or HNRNPP2 gene) located at band 16 on the short arm of chromosome 16; and 3) the TAF15 protein encoded by the TAF15 gene (also termed the TATA-box binding protein associated factor 15, Npl3, RBP56, TAF2N, or TAFII68 gene) located at band 12 on the long arm of chromosome 7 The FET in this protein family's name derives from the first letters of FUS, EWSR1, and TAF15.

FET proteins are abundantly expressed in virtually all tissues examined. They are RNA-binding proteins. By binding to their RNA targets, they contribute to the regulation of: a) the transcription of genes into pre-messenger RNA, the splicing of pre-messenger RNA into mature messenger RNA, and the transport of these RNAs between different areas of their parent cells; b) the processing of micro-RNAs that are involved in RNA silencing and post-transcriptional regulation of gene expression; and c) the detection and repair of damaged DNA. Through these multiple, complex, and often incompletely understood actions, the FET family proteins regulate the cellular expression of diverse genes. However, the genes for FET proteins often undergo various types of mutation. While these mutations and the diseases with which they are associated can be found in the Wikipedia pages on these diseases, this article focuses on one type of mutation, the fusion gene mutation. Fusion genes are formed from two previously independent genes that become united due to a chromosome translocation, deletion of some genetic material in a chromosome, or chromosomal inversion. For example, the EWSR1-FL1 fusion gene is made by a chromosomal translocation which merges part of the EWSR1 gene normally located on band 12 of the long (or "q") arm of chromosome 22 with part of the FLI1 ETS transcription factor family gene normally located on band 24 of the long arm of chromosome 11. The EWSR1-FLI1 fusion gene encodes an EWS-FLI1 chimeric protein which possesses unregulated and excessive FLI1 transcription factor activity which it appears to contribute to the development of Ewing sarcomas. FET fusion genes have attracted recent interest because they have been found to be associated with, and may act to promote the development of, a wide range of soft tissue neoplasms derived from mesenchymal tissue cells. Detection of a FET gene–containing fusion gene is extremely helpful in diagnosing tumor types, defining the pathogenic mechanisms by which these fusion proteins promote disorders, and thereby identifying potential targets for treating these disorders. The following are examples of these fusion genes' associations with malignant and benign neoplastic tumors.

== Malignant neoplasms ==
- Ewing sarcoma: Almost all cases of the classical form of the Ewing sarcomas have tumor cells that express a fusion gene that merges part of a FET family gene with part of an ETS transcription factor family gene (i.e. a FLI1, ERG, ETV1, ETV4, or FEV gene). These fusion genes are the EWSR1–FLI1 fusion gene in 80-85% of cases or EWSR1-ERG fusion gene in 5 to 10% of cases. Rare cases of classical Ewing sarcoma tumor cells express an EWSR1 or FUS gene fused to an ETV1, ETV4, or FEV gene. The neoplastic cells in the round cell sarcoma variant of the Ewing sarcomas (sometimes termed NFATC2-rearranged sarcomas) express fusion genes composed of an FET family gene fused to a gene that is not a ETS transcription family gene. These fusion genes are EWSR1-NFATC2, FUS-NFATC2, and EWSR1-PATZ1.
- Desmoplastic small-round-cell tumors: These tumors' neoplastic cells consistently express the EWSR1-WT1 fusion gene.
- Myxoid liposarcoma: these tumors' neoplastic cells express the FUS-DDIT3 fusion gene in 90% or the EWSR1-DDIT3 fusion gene in rare cases of the disease.
- Angiomatoid fibrous histiocytoma: The neoplastic cells in these tumors express a EWSR1-CREB1 fusion gene in most cases or a EWSR1-CREB, FUS-CREB, EWSR1-ATF1, FUS-ATF1, WSR1-CREM, or FUS-CREM fusion gene in uncommon cases of the disease.
- Intracranial mesenchymal tumors with FET‐CREB fusions: These tumors are suggested to be a variant of the angiomatoid fibrous histiocytoma tumors. By definition, the neoplastic cells in all of these tumors express FET-CREB fusion genes. Of 20 reported cases, the fusion genes in these tumors' neoplastic cells were the EWSR1‐ATF1 (8 cases), EWSR1‐CREB1 (7 cases), EWSR1‐CREM (4 cases), and FUS‐CREM (1 case).
- Primary pulmonary myxoid sarcoma: Among 27 reported cases of these extremely rare tumors, 17 expressed the EWSR1-CREB1 and 1 expressed a not further defined EWSR1 gene rearrangement in their neoplastic cells.
- Clear cell sarcomas: This tumors' neoplastic cells expressed the EWSR1-ATF1 fusion gene in a majority of cases or a EWSR1-CREB1, EWSR1-CREM, or EWSR1-DDIT3 fusion gene in a small subset of cases.
- Clear cell sarcoma-like gastrointestinal tumor (also termed gastrointestinal neuroectodermal tumor): The neoplastic cells in these tumors express an EWSR1:ATF1 or EWSR1:CREB1 fusion genes in >50% or ~25% of cases, respectively.
- Mesothelioma: A small subset of these tumors have neoplastic cells that express a EWSR1-CREB fusion gene or, in fewer cases, a FUS-CREB fusion gene.
- Myoepithelioma: About 50% of these tumors have neoplastic cells which express a fusion gene consisting of a EWSR1 gene fused to a PBX1, PBX3, ZNF444, POU5F1, ATF1, or KLF17 gene or in less common cases a FUS gene fused to one of the latter genes.
- Sclerosing epithelioid fibrosarcoma: The neoplastic cells in these tumors express the EWSR1-CREB3L1 fusion gene in ~30%, the FUS-CREB3L2 fusion gene in 12%, and the EWSR1-CREB3L2, EWSR1-CREB3L3, or EWSR1-CREM fusion gene in rare cases of the disease, and other as yet not fully defined rearrangements in the EWSR1 gene.
- Low-grade fibromyxoid sarcoma: The neoplastic cells in these tumors express the FUS-CREB3L2 fusion gene in the majority or the FUS-CREB3L1, EWSR1-CREB3L2, or EWSR2-CREBL1 fusion gene in a minority of cases.
- Extraskeletal myxoid chondrosarcoma: These tumors' neoplastic cells express the EWSR1-NR4A3 fusion gene in most cases or the TAF15-NR4A3 in occasional cases of the disease.
- EWSR1-SMAD3-positive fibroblastic tumor: These tumors, which are a recently characterized neoplasm with distinct clinicopathologic features, are currently defined by the expression of the EWSR1-SMAD3 fusion gene in their neoplastic cells.
- Epithelioid and spindle cell rhabdomyosarcoma with EWSR1/FUS-TFCP2 Fusion: These newly described tumors are regarded as a small subset of the rhabdomyosarcomas that by definition contain neoplastic cells that express the EWSR1-TFCP2 or FUS-TFCP2 fusion gene.

== Benign neoplasms ==
- Simple bone cyst (also termed unicameral bone cysts): A subset of these tumors contain neoplastic cells that express the FUS-NFATC2 or EWSR1-NFATC2 fusion gene. A recent study reported that the neoplastic cells in these cysts expressed a FUS-NFATC2 fusion gene in four and the EWSR1-NFATC2 fusion gene in two of nine test cases.
- Hemangioma of bone with an EWSR1-NFATC1 Fusion: These rare tumors are a subset of hemangiomas that by definition are in bone tissues and consist of neoplastic cells that express the EWSR1-NFATC1 fusion gene.
