= C21orf140 =

Human gene

Identifiers
- Aliases: C21orf140, chromosome 21 open reading frame 140, FAM243A, family with sequence similarity 243 member A
- External IDs: MGI: 1922578; GeneCards: C21orf140

Gene location (Human)
Chr.	Chromosome 21 (human)
Band	21q22.12	Start	34,400,112 bp
Band	21q22.12	End	34,401,072 bp

Gene location (Mouse)
Chr.	Chromosome 16 (mouse)
Band	16|16 C4	Start	92,115,653 bp
Band	16|16 C4	End	92,118,329 bp
RNA expression pattern
Bgee	Human / Mouse (ortholog); Top expressed in: testicle; superior frontal gyrus; stromal cell of endometrium; prefrontal cortex; muscle of thigh; primary visual cortex; right testis; right coronary artery; left testis; Achilles tendon / Top expressed in: seminiferous tubule; spermatid; retinal pigment epithelium; spermatocyte; lateral ventricle; choroid plexus of lateral ventricle; human kidney; right kidney; pancreas; major salivary gland; More reference expression data
BioGPS	n/a
Orthologs
Databases	NCBI: entry; OMA: entry
Species	Human	Mouse
Entrez	101928147	75328
Ensembl	ENSG00000222018	ENSMUSG00000051728
UniProt	P0DPQ4	Q8CDS7
RefSeq (mRNA)	NM_001282537	NM_029252
RefSeq (protein)	NP_001351640; NP_001269466	NP_083528
Location (UCSC)	Chr 21: 34.4 – 34.4 Mb	Chr 16: 92.12 – 92.12 Mb
PubMed search
- Wikidata
View/Edit Human	View/Edit Mouse

Chromosome 21, open reading frame 140 (C21orf140) is a protein which in humans is encoded by the C21orf140 gene. Its primary alias is Family With Sequence Similarity 243 Member A (FAM243A).

== Gene ==
C21orf140 is 961 base pairs long, located in chromosome 21 of the human genome at the coordinates 21q22.12 on the minus strand, position 34,400,112 to 34,401,072. It contains only one exon.

=== Expression patterns ===
C21orf140 is widely expressed in most tissues, with the stomach and retina showing the highest expression levels. Little to no expression has been found in the parathyroid gland, rectum, epididymis, seminal vesicle, smooth muscle, tonsil, and thymus. Additionally, expression is seen in many regions of the brain, with the highest levels in the white matter and choroid plexus.

== Transcript and regulation ==
C21orf140 has a single transcript, an mRNA that is 961 nucleotides long. It has no 5' untranslated region (UTR).

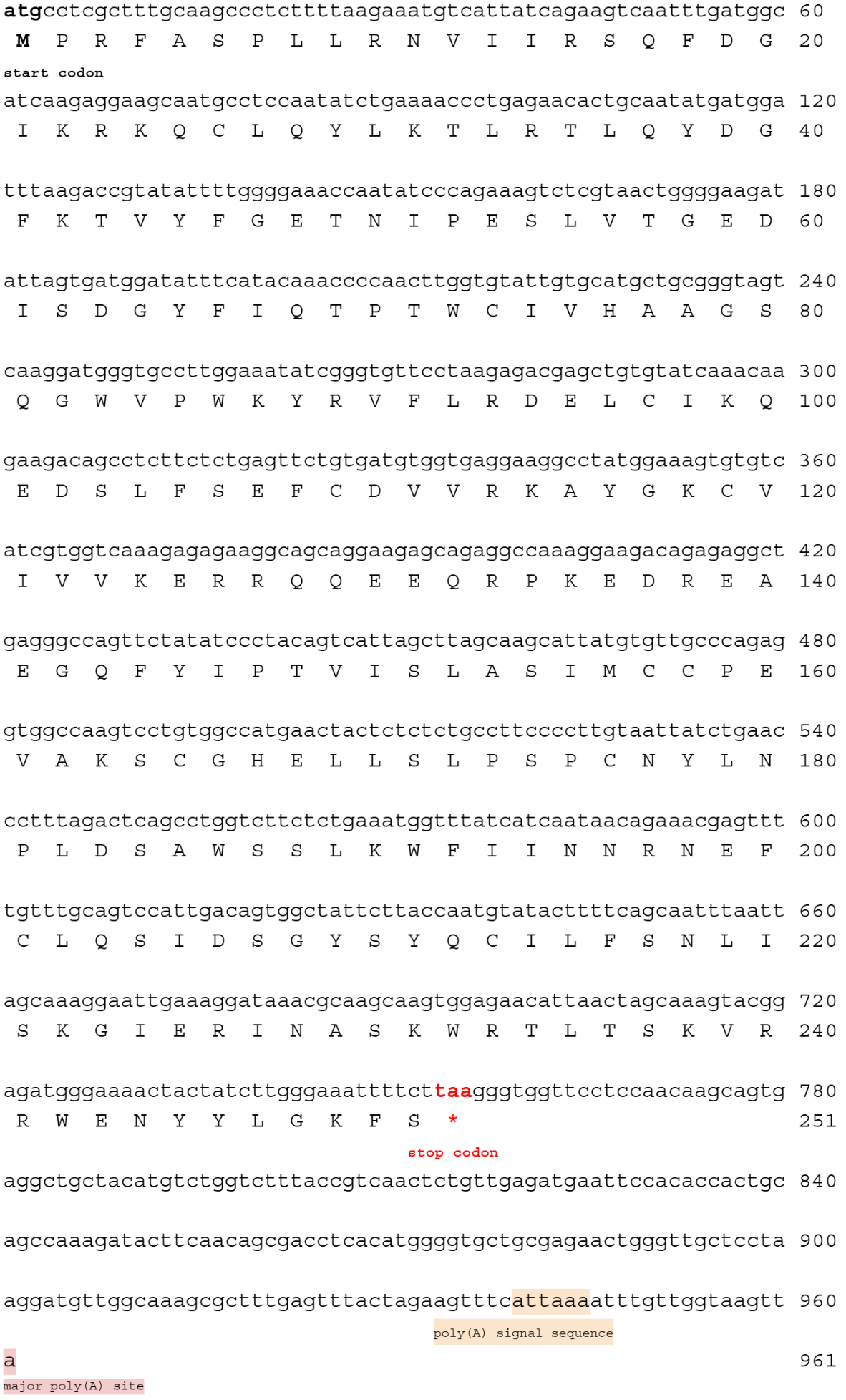
Conceptual translation of C21orf140 mRNA. Start codon, stop codon, and poly(A) sites are labeled

Despite its lack of a 5' UTR, there are RBMX and PABPC1 RNA binding protein sites in the 60 nucleotides upstream of the C21orf140 start codon.

In the coding region, sequences conserved in mammalian orthologs overlap with some identified transcription factor binding sites, including JUN, TFAP4, ETV1, and ZBTB18.

The 3' UTR contains binding sites for the microRNAs miR-9-5p, miR-1294, miR-9986, miR-647, miR-628-3p, and miR-590-3p.

== Protein ==
The C21orf140 protein contains 251 amino acids and a calculated molecular weight of ~29 kDa. Its theoretical isoelectric point is pH = 8.7. There is one known isoform. It is the sole member of the FAM243 protein family in humans, according to a UniProt query. It contains less alanine (3.6%) and less histidine (0.8%) than the average human protein.

=== Protein motifs ===
The C21orf140 protein is predicted to contain mixed charge cluster from residues 110 to 141. The periodic pattern "LXX" repeats four times from residues 27 to 38. Another periodic pattern, “SXXXXLXXX," repeats four times from residues 154 to 193 (the letter X stands in for any amino acid). A predicted bipartite nuclear localization signal spans from residues 113 to 127.

=== Post-translational modifications ===
The human C21orf140 protein is bioinformatically predicted to contain two phosphorylated serine residues, three phosphorylatedthreonine residues, and an N-glycosylated asparagine. Additionally, four cysteine pairs are predicted to form disulfide bonds. No protein modifications have been experimentally confirmed.

Predicted Human C21orf140 PTMs
Predicted PTM	Residue Location(s)	Possible Function
phosphoserine	16, 188	activation or signaling
phosphothreonine	32, 57, 236	activation or signaling
N-glycosylated asparagine	228	protein sorting or folding
cysteine-cysteine disulfide bond	26/73, 109/119, 157/176, 201/213	protein tertiary structure formation

Though it has not been found yet, there may be a cleavage site to separate the portion of the protein containing the bipartite nuclear localization signal from the portion containing the N-glycosylated asparagine, allowing the former to be sorted to the nucleus and the latter to exist in the extracellular space.

=== Secondary and tertiary structures ===
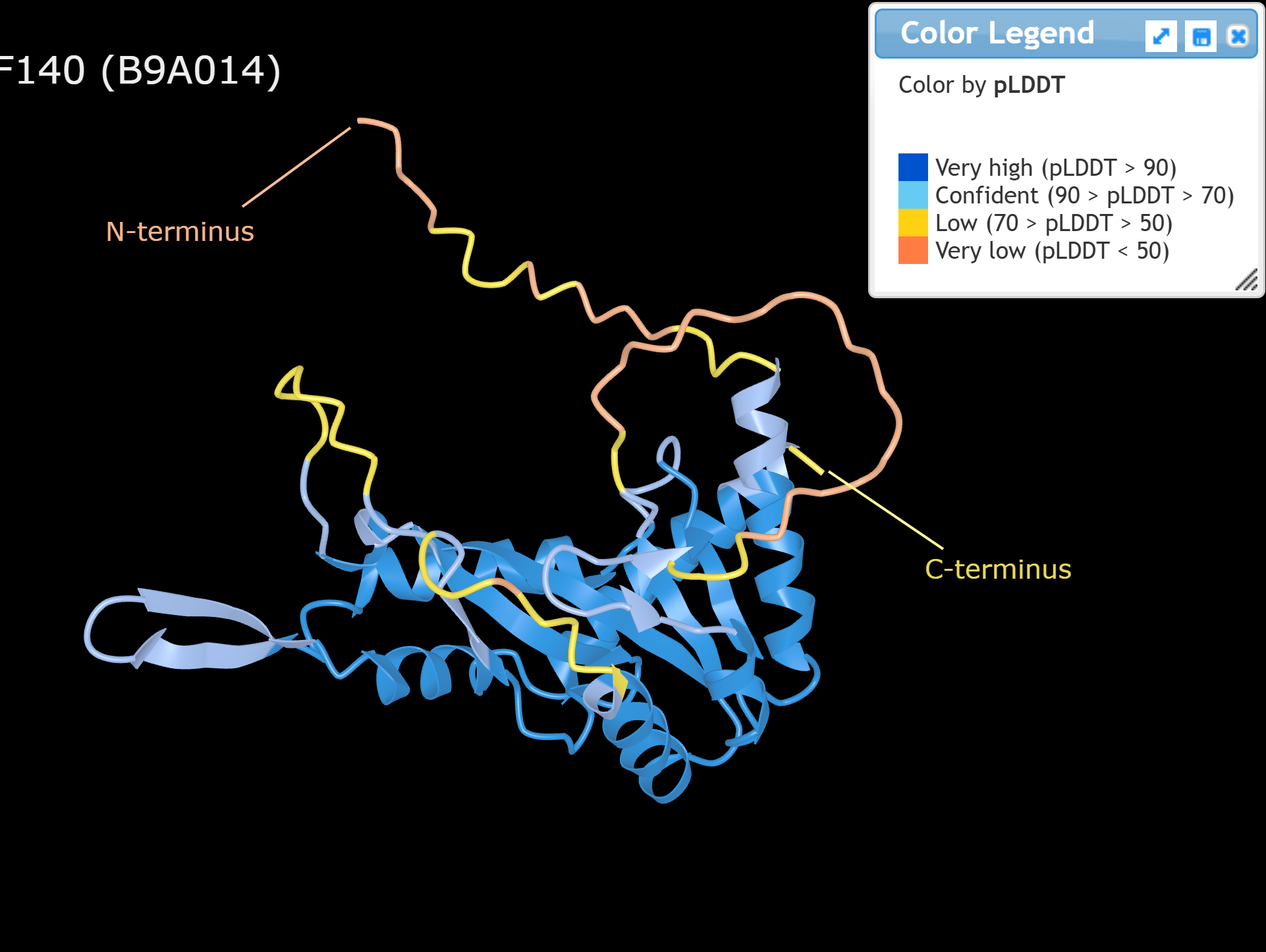
Predicted human C21orf140 protein tertiary structure by AlphaFold visualized in NCBI iCn3D with pLDDT confidence scores. Higher pLDDT score indicates greater model confidence in the predicted structure

The C21orf140 protein is predicted to contain a globular domain from residues 2 to 167. Residues 168 to 182 and 243 to 251 are predicted to be disordered regions.

=== Protein interactions ===
The C21orf140 protein has no known interactions with other human proteins other than co-mentions in an article listed in PubMed.

== Evolutionary history ==
=== Paralogs ===
An NCBI protein BLAST search against the human genome shows no paralogs of C21orf140 in humans.

=== Orthologs ===
An NCBI protein BLAST search shows orthologs of C21orf140 in mammals, birds, reptiles, amphibians, bony and cartilaginous fish, bivalves, insects, and sponges. A list of selected orthologs is shown below. C21orf140 has been moderately conserved across its evolutionary history. C21orf140 likely appeared around 758 million years ago in an ancient invertebrate ancestor, as evidenced by the most distant orthologs found in sponges of the phylum Porifera.

Selected Orthologs of Human C21orf140 Protein
Scientific name	Common name	Taxonomic group	Median date of human divergence (MYA)	NCBI Accession number	Protein size (aa)	Sequence identity to human (%)	Sequence similarity to human (%)
Homo sapiens	Human	Primates	0	NP_001269466	251	100	100
Mus musculus	House mouse	Rodentia	87	NP_083528	251	70.5	85.3
Equus caballus	Domestic horse	Perissodactyla	94	XP_014591979	243	78.1	86.1
Phocoena sinus	Vaquita	Cetacea	94	XP_032487142	256	77	87.5
Indicator indicator	Greater honeyguide	Aves	319	XP_054247325	253	47.4	68.4
Gallus gallus	Red junglefowl	Aves	319	XP_004934593	316	40.2	57.6
Crocodylus porosus	Saltwater crocodile	Reptilia	319	XP_019384587	252	57.5	73.8
Gekko japonicus	Schlegel's Japanese gecko	Reptilia	319	XP_015278925	252	56.6	73.4
Ascaphus truei	Coastal tailed frog	Amphibia	352	XP_075449410	250	49.4	67.7
Microcaecilia unicolor	N/A	Amphibia	352	XP_030058389	255	47.7	67.3
Huso huso	Beluga sturgeon	Actinopterygii	429	KAK6473583	253	39.8	54.2
Tachysurus fulvidraco	Yellow catfish	Actinopterygii	429	XP_026991742	252	27.6	43.5
Heterodontus francisci	Horn shark	Chondrichthyes	462	XP_067903089	257	43.1	59.9
Hemitrygon akajei	Red stingray	Chondrichthyes	462	XP_072915967	273	36.6	53.3
Vanessa atalanta	Red admiral	Insecta	686	XP_047544623	487	13.9	23.9
Aphis gossypii	Cotton aphid	Insecta	686	XP_027839080	460	13.6	22.9
Mytilus galloprovincialis	Mediterranean mussel	Bivalvia	686	VDI40316	549	14.2	22.6
Eriocheir sinensis	Chinese mitten crab	Crustacea	686	XP_050722331	530	11.5	20.4
Dysidea avara	N/A	Porifera	758	XP_065883736	252	20.1	34
Amphimedon queenslandica	N/A	Porifera	758	XP_011406833	457	16.2	26.5

== Clinical significance ==
C21orf140 has been mentioned in the scientific literature in contexts with implications for human health. A 2024 proteomics study found that C21orf140 is downregulated in individuals with obsessive-compulsive disorder. A 2024 GWAS study mapped C21orf140 and its SNPs as one of twenty genes in a shared genetic risk cluster linked with conditions including schizophrenia, substance abuse disorders, bipolar disorder, and depression. A 2022 oncogenomic study associated tumoral C21orf140 mutations with a lack of lasting benefit from hyperthermic intraperitoneal chemotherapy for gastric cancer.
