= Clear-cell tumor =

Clear-cell tumor (any with clear cells) can refer to:

- clear-cell sarcoma, including
  - clear-cell sarcoma of the kidney
- clear-cell carcinoma, mostly
  - clear-cell adenocarcinoma
