= Sclerosing epithelioid fibrosarcoma =

- Specialty: Dermatology, Dermatopathology, Pathology, Surgical oncology, Oncology
- Causes: Unknown
- Treatment: Surgical removal of tumor
- Prognosis: Guarded

Sclerosing epithelioid fibrosarcoma (SEF) is a very rare malignant tumor of soft tissues that on microscopic examination consists of small round or ovoid neoplastic epithelioid fibroblast-like cells, i.e. cells that have features resembling both epithelioid cells and fibroblasts. In 2020, the World Health Organization classified SEF as a distinct tumor type in the category of malignant fibroblastic and myofibroblastic tumors. However, current studies have reported that low-grade fibromyxoid sarcoma (LGFMS) has many clinically and pathologically important features characteristic of SEF; these studies suggest that LGSFMS may be an early form of, and over time progress to become, a SEF. Since the World Health Organization has classified LGFMS as one of the malignant fibroblastic and myofibroblastic tumors that is distinctly different than SEF, SEF and LGFMS are here regarded as different tumor forms.

Sclerosing epithelioid fibrosarcomas are aggressive tumors that usually develop in adults and elderly individuals or, in a small minority of cases, children. SEF tumors often occur in a shoulder, hip, or lower areas of the legs and arms or, less commonly, in a vital organ or other tissue location that may be in virtually any part of the body. SEF tumors tend to recur at the site where they are surgically removed, to metastasize to other tissues, and to have poor outcomes.

Surgical resection of the primary or recurrent tumor with or without adjuvant radiation therapy has been the mainstay treatment for SEF. This treatment is often employed in order to achieve control of the tumor's local injurious effects. The sensitivity of SEF tumors to various chemotherapy regimens has been very limited. The prognosis of SEF is guarded because surgery with or without radiation therapy and chemotherapy frequently does not stop, or only stops for a short time, the progression of this disease.

== Presentation ==
Individuals presenting with SEF tumors are 3 to 87 years old (median age 44.6 years) with most individuals aged 30-60 years. These tumors involve the lower limb and shoulder areas (28.3% of cases), trunk (18.7%), head and neck areas (11.7%), lung and its pleura (10.0%), bone (including the spinal vertebrae) (10.0%), soft tissues (9.1%), upper limb and shoulder areas (7.5%), kidney (3.9%), pancreas (0.9%), liver (0.4%), and brain (0.4%). Rare cases of SEF tumors have developed in the ovary and lower gastrointestinal tract. In two separate studies, 17% and 27% of patients presented with metastases at the time of the initial diagnosis of their disease. While most individuals present with a painless mass, about 33% report having a painful and enlarging mass. The tumor may have been noticed and even painful for a few months to years. Tumors developing in the head, abdominal cavity, or other space-constrained sites often present with symptoms and signs related to their tumors' mass effects. For example, 5 of 5 patients diagnosed with SEF tumors in the spinal vertebrae presented with pain that they had experienced for 3 to 6 months and 2 of 2 patients with a SEF located in the buttock presented with highly painful sciatica. SEF tumors have varied in size from 1 to 25 cm in diameter (average diameter, 8.3 cm). In one small study, all individuals treated with surgical resection of their tumors, re-presented with recurrences of their tumors at the sites of their surgical removal and 91% re-presented with metastases (67% to the lung, 50% to bone, and 1 case each to the liver, brain and abdomen).

== Pathology ==
As defined by microscopic histopathologic analyses of hematoxylin and eosin stained tissue samples, SEF tumors vary from lower to higher cellular lesions. These cells are small-to-moderate-sized epitheliod-like cells that on ultrastructural analyses have features of fibroblasts and myofibroblasts. The cells contain moderate numbers of mitochondria, abundant rough endoplasmic reticulum networks, large Golgi complexes, and cytoplasmic arrays of vimentin intermediate filaments. The cells tend to be grouped into nests, sheets, cords, and/or single files embedded in an eosinophilic (i.e. more blue or purple compared to normal connective tissue because of excessive uptake of the hematoxylin stain), sclerotic (i.e. hardened) connective tissue background. The connective tissue background contains irregular, thin-walled, distended blood vessels and may have foci of hyaline cartilage, bone formation, and necrosis (clumps of dead or dying cells).

Immunohistochemical analyses find that the neoplastic cells in SEF tumors typically express MUC1, vimentin, Bcl-2, CD99, and MUC4 marker proteins. MUC1, vimentin, CD99, and Bcl-2 marker proteins are expressed in the neoplastic cells of various types of other tumors and therefore do not distinguish between these tumors and SEF. However the expression of MUC4 is found mainly in the neoplastic cells of SEF and low-grade fibroblastic tumors. Consequently, the expression of the MUC4 marker protein in tumor cells suggests that these tumors are either a SEF or low-grade fibromyxoid sarcoma rather than certain mimickers of SEF. SEF tumors with MUC4-negative neoplastic cells may be more aggressive than SEF tumors with MUC4-positive neoplastic cells.

== Gene and chromosome abnormalities ==
Several genetic alterations in SEF neoplastic cells are fusion genes. A fusion gene is a hybrid gene formed from two previously independent genes due to a chromosome translocation, deletion in some of the genetic material in a chromosome, or chromosomal inversion. For example, the EWSR1-CREB3L1 fusion gene expressed by SEF neoplastic cells is made by a chromosomal translocation which unites part of the EWSR1 gene normally located on band 12.2 of the long (or "q") arm of chromosome 22 with part of the CREB3L1 gene normally located on band 11.2 of the short arm of chromosome 11. This particular fusion gene is predicted to be functional, i.e. capable of forming an EWSR1-CREB3L1 chimeric protein product. The largest study to date tested 26 SEF patients for certain types of gene rearrangements in their tumors' neoplastic cells. The study found that these tumor cells expressed: the EWSR1-CREB3L1 fusion gene in 7 cases, the EWSR1-CREB3L2 fusion gene in 1 case, the FUS-CREB3L2 fusion gene in 3 cases, the YAP1-KMT2A fusion gene in 2 cases, other types of rearrangements (e.g. deletions) in one or both of their EWSR1 genes in 12 cases, and inconclusive results in 1 case. A smaller study found the EWSR1-CREB3L1 fusion gene in the neoplastic cells of 3 of 8 and EWSR1 gene rearrangements in 2 of 8 SEF cases. The neoplastic cells in rare cases of SEF have been reported to express a PAX5-CREB3L1, EWSR1-CREB3L3, EWSR1-CREM, YAP1-KMT2A, or KMT2D-PRRX1 fusion gene.

The products made by the CREB3L1, CREB3L2, and CREB3L3 genes are cAMP response element-binding protein transcription factors which regulate cell proliferation, survival, and the development of gene maturations. The EWSR1 and FUS gene product proteins belong to the FET protein family of proteins which regulate gene expression as well as mRNA/micro-RNA processing and may contribute to the development of various cancers. The YAP1 gene product, yes-associated protein, contributes to the regulation of cell proliferation and apoptosis, i.e. programmed cell death (see YAP1). {The YAP1 gene is an oncogene, i.e. a potential cancer-causing gene). The KMT2A and KMT2D gene product proteins regulate gene transcription and may contribute to the development of various cancers (see KMT2A and KMT2D). And, the PRRX1 gene product protein regulates epithelial-mesenchymal transition and may be involved in the development of various cancers.

Further studies are needed to determine if any of these fusion genes produce chimeric proteins that retain the cancer-promoting activity of their protein components and thereby contribute to the development and/or progression of SEF. However, the presence of these fusion genes in a tumor can be helpful in determining if a tumor is an SEF or some other neoplasia that can mimic SEF (see Diagnosis section).

== Diagnosis ==
Based on their presentation and pathology, SEF tumors can be very difficult to differentiate from some cases of desmoid tumors, nodular fasciitis, and low-grade fibromyxoid sarcomas. Relative to the latter three tumor types, however, the presence of tumor neoplastic cells that: 1) express the MUC4 marker protein and a FUS-CREB3L2 fusion gene or an otherwise rearranged FUS gene strongly suggest that the tumor is a SEF; 2) express the EWSR1-CREB3L1 fusion gene suggest that the tumor is a SEF but in any case is unlikely to be a low-grade fibromyxoid sarcoma. 3) express a FUS-CREB3L2 fusion gene is more likely to be a low-grade fibromyxoid sarcoma than a SEF (i.e. the FUS-CREB3L2 fusion gene is present in >90% of low-grade fibromyxoid sarcomas but only ~20% of SEF tumor cells); or 4) express an EWSR1-CREB3L1 or EWSR1-CREB3L2 fusion gene is likely to be a SEF tumor. SEF tumors have also been mistaken for rare types of other sarcomas that sometimes have epithelioid features such as mesenchymal chondrosarcomas, Ewing sarcomas, osteosarcomas, sclerosing variants of rhabdomyosarcoma, or leiomyosarcomas. They also may be mistaken for certain metastatic carcinomas such as signet ring cell carcinoma and lobular forms of breast cancer. Extensive immunohistochemistry analyses can help to differentiate these tumors from SEF tumors.

== Treatment and prognosis ==
Surgical resection has been the mainstay treatment for sclerosing epithelioid fibrosarcoma tumors. However, these tumors are often located where complete surgical removal is not feasible, where the tumor is too large or tissue-infiltrating for complete surgical removal, and/or where the tumor is associated with distant metastases. Consequently, SEF tumors have commonly been treated with wide local excision, amputation of an involved extremity, radiotherapy, and/or chemotherapy, depending on the tumors surgical accessibility and spread to other tissues. Often, however, the goal of these treatment regimens is to obtain control of the tumor's local harmful effects. In one study, among 45 patients presenting with SEF tumors, 38 underwent surgical resection with 3 having a second resection because tumor tissue had been left behind; 2 underwent debulking without removal of all the tumor tissue; 2 had supportive care for unresectionable disease; 6 had resection of local recurrences; 6 underwent surgical resections of metastatic tumors; 25 underwent radiation therapy aimed at treating both the primary and associated metastatic tumors; and 26 received chemotherapy for primary, recurrent, and, in particular, metastatic disease. The chemotherapy regimens included one or more of the following drugs, doxorubicin, ifosfamide, docetaxel, gemcitabine, pazopanib, vincristine, cisplatin, cyclophosphamide, etoposide, and/or dacarbazine. Nonetheless, studies suggest that radiotherapy should only be administered in cases where surgery is impossible and/or has the potential to slow the progression of the disease and all currently used chemotherapeutic regimens have generally been ineffective in controlling these tumors.

In a study of 45 patients with SEF, 19 were alive with disease after a median time of 41 months (range: 6 to 264 months), 19 died of the disease at a median of 49 months (range: 5 to 216 months), and 5 had no evidence of disease at a median of 63 months (range: 18 to 120 months) after being diagnosed with and then treated for their disease. In another study of 13 patients who were followed long-term, 12 patients developed metastatic disease of which 10 died; the overall survival median time after diagnosis was 47.3 months and after metastasis was 16.3 months. However, there was a wide range in the survival of these patients: while 4 died within the first year of diagnosis, 7 reached the 3-year survival mark, some survived for >10 years, and several continued to be clinically well for a number of years after developing metastatic disease.
