= Chondroclast =

A chondroclast is a multinucleated giant cell that participates in cartilage resorption. The cell is TRAP-positive (Tartrate-resistant acid phosphatase) and morphologically indistinguishable from the osteoclast. However, morphometric evaluation showed that chondroclasts do not form ruffled edges and clear zones, i.e., known resorption characteristics, to the same extent as osteoclasts, present at the lower metaphysis. Instead, chondroclasts tend to exhibit an undifferentiated surface adjacent to the matrix, which is structurally indistinguishable from the basolateral plasma membrane. The chondroclast/osteoclast originates from bone marrow stem cells. They arise from the fusion of monocytes.

Chondroclasts and osteoclasts are also transcriptionally distinct cell populations and exhibit discrete transcriptomic features. Molecular pathways are specific to chondroclasts and osteoclasts. Chondroclasts and osteoclasts have subsets of metabolic genes that are specific to chondroclasts. Protein-protein interaction network analysis shows an abundance of structured networks of metabolic pathways, ATP synthesis, and proteasome pathways in chondroclasts. Gene regulatory network analysis using the transcription factor target gene network predicts a pool of genes including ETV6, SIRT1, and ATF1 as chondroclast-specific gene signatures.

Direct contact of chondroclasts/osteoclasts with calcified cartilage may be crucial for normal endochondral ossification.

Resorption of unmineralised subchondral cartilage by chondroclasts and macrophages can be a feature of joint destruction in inflammatory and non-inflammatory arthropathies as well as inflammatory and neoplastic subchondral bone lesions.

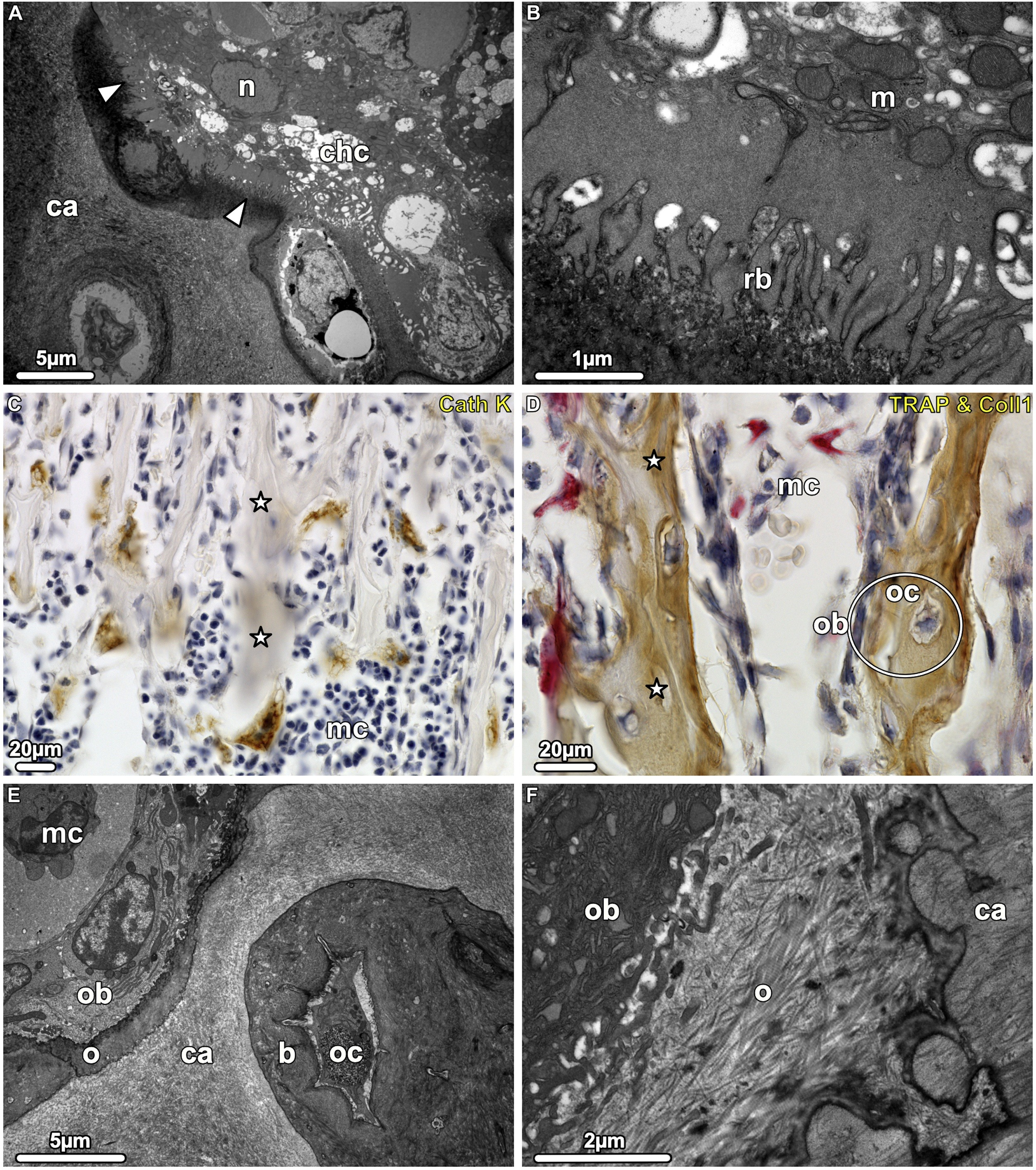
C. Cathepsin K IHC. Polynucleated chondroclasts (brown staining) attach to the cartilage scaffold (asterisks) and synthesize cathepsin K to degrade the type-II collagen network.

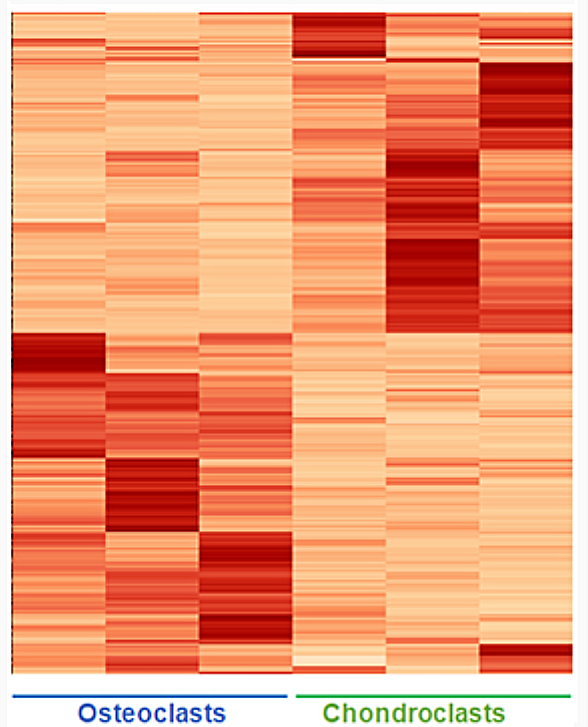
Differential gene analyses reveal discrete transcriptomic signature of chondroclasts and osteoclasts.

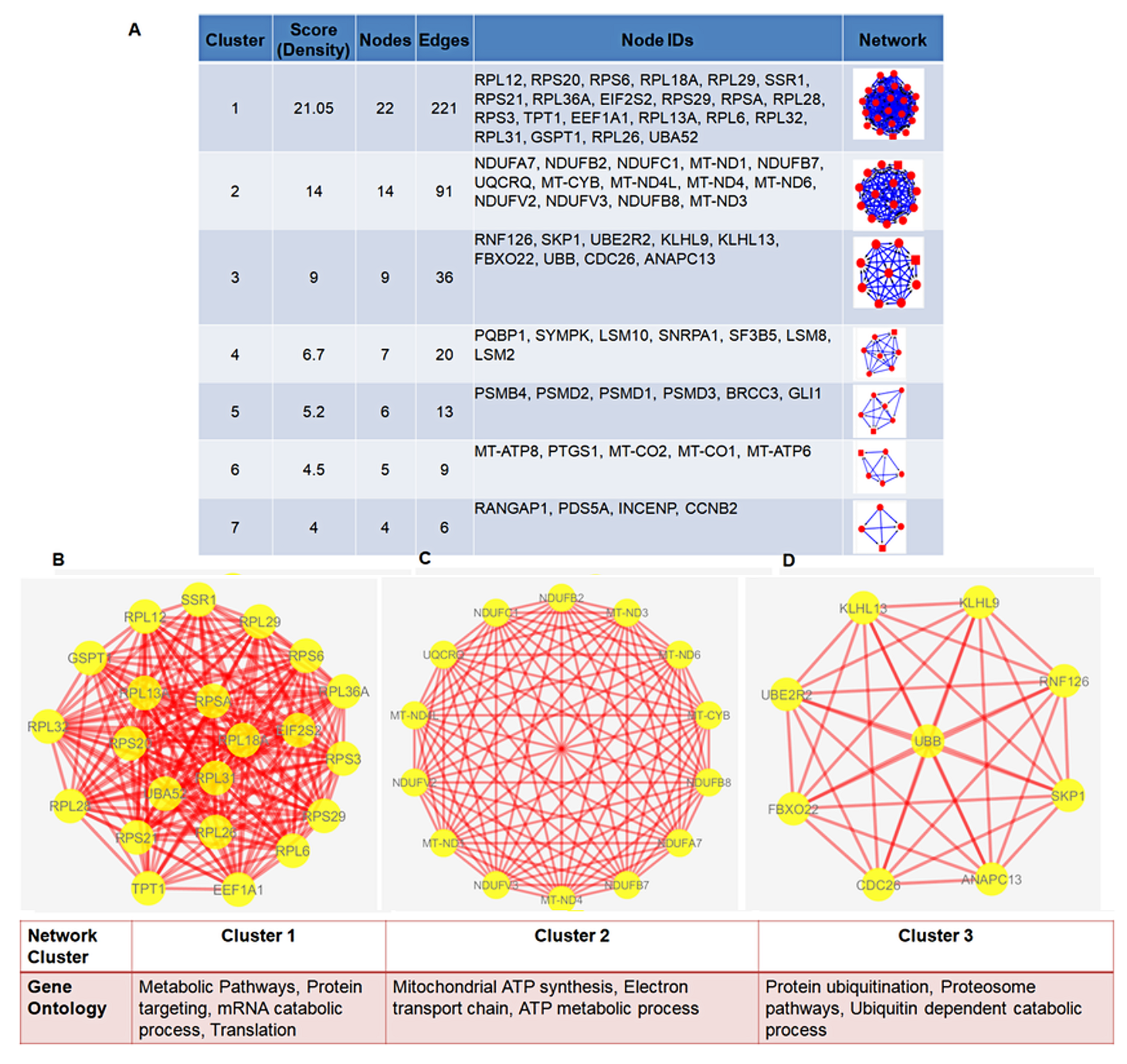
Network analysis reveals the abundance of structured networks of metabolic pathways, ATP synthesis, and proteasome pathways in chondroclasts.

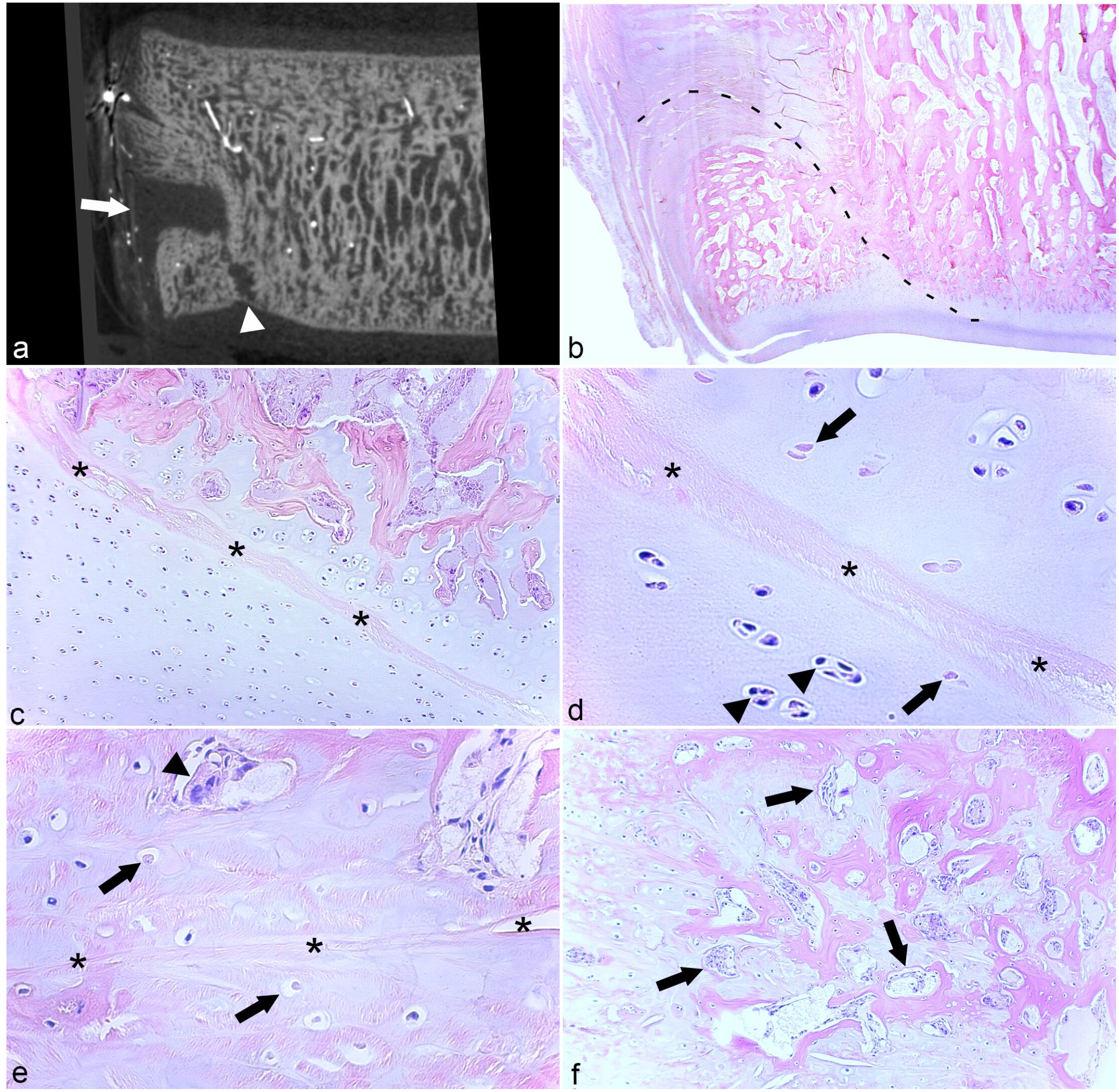
(e) necrotic chondrocytes (arrows), that is, osteochondrosis manifesta. There is also a chondroclast (arrowhead), presumably engaged in the removal of necrotic cartilage. (f) Adjacent to (e). Within the granulation tissue, there are osteoblasts (arrows) with osteoid, indicating repair by intramembranous ossification.
