= GNET =

GNET or GNet, may refer to:

- Global Network on Extremism and Technology, institute for academic terrorism research
- GNet, a network library
- Gastrointestinal neuroectodermal tumor
