= HCCC =

HCCC may refer to:

- Hampshire County Cricket Club in England, UK
- Health Care Complaints Commission in NSW, Australia
- Holy Cross Catholic Cemetery, a Catholic cemetery in Chai Wan, Hong Kong
- Hoppers Crossing Cricket Club in Victoria, Australia
- Hudson County Community College in NJ, USA
- Hyalinizing clear cell carcinoma
