= Unicameral bone cyst =

- Other names: Solitary bone cyst, unicameral bone cyst (not recommended)
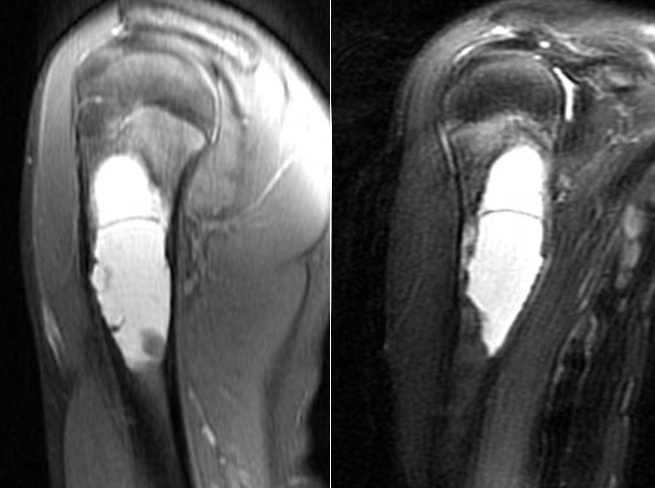
- MRI scan: simple bone cyst humerus of a 13 year old boy
- Specialty: Orthopedics
- Symptoms: Pain, swelling, reduced movement, pathological fracture or no symptoms
- Causes: Unknown
- Diagnostic method: Medical imaging
- Frequency: Age less than 20 years. M:F ratio: 2:1

A unicameral bone cyst, also known as a simple bone cyst, is a cavity filled with a yellow-colored fluid. It is considered to be benign since it does not spread beyond the bone. Unicameral bone cysts can be classified into two categories: active and latent. An active cyst is adjacent to the epiphyseal plate and tends to grow until it fills the entire diaphysis, the shaft, of the bone; depending on the invasiveness of the cyst, it can cause a pathological fracture or even destroy the epiphyseal plate leading to the permanent shortening of the bone.

A latent cyst is located away from the epiphyseal plate and is more likely to heal with treatment. It is typically diagnosed in under 20 year olds. Although unicameral bone cysts can form in any bone structure, it is predominantly found in the proximal humerus and proximal femur; additionally, it affects males twice as often as females.

Treatment options for unicameral bone cysts include invasive approaches such as injections, curettage and surgical fixation, and non-invasive procedures including observation to see if it does not get worse or resolves on its own, plaster casting or restricted activity.

== Signs and symptoms ==
Most unicameral bone cysts do not cause any symptoms and are discovered as accidental findings on radiographs or CT scans made for other reasons. Large lesions can cause nearby areas of bone to thin, which may result in a fracture and cause pain.

== Cause ==
There is not a specific theory behind the etiology of the unicameral bone cyst, however, according to many researchers and doctors, there is a commonly known theory hypothesized by Jonathan Cohen in 1970. Cohen studied interstitial fluid in six children undergoing treatment for unicameral bone cysts. He believed that the chemical composition of the fluid found in the bone cyst was similar to the chemical make-up in serum. Cohen theorized that the unicameral bone cyst occurs when interstitial fluids in cancellous bones quickly accumulate in one region from blockage.

One of the other theories is that the cysts result from a disorder of the growth plate. Another is that the cysts result from problems with circulation that are caused by a developmental anomaly in the veins of the affected bone. The role trauma plays in the development of these cysts is unknown. Some speculate that repeated trauma puts the bone at risk for developing a bone cyst. This, however, has not been proven.

Recently, some of these tumors have been found to contain cells that express the FUS-NFATC2 or EWSR1-NFATC2 fusion gene. (Fusion genes are formed from two previously independent genes that become united due to a chromosome translocation, deletion of some genetic material in a chromosome, or chromosomal inversion. These two fusion genes are described in FET gene family.) A recent study reported that the neoplastic cells in these cysts expressed a FUS-NFATC2 fusion gene in four and a EWSR1-NFATC2 fusion gene in two of nine test cases. It is suggested that the presence of these fusion genes indicates that SEC is a true neoplasm.

== Diagnosis ==
=== X-rays ===
Unicameral bone cysts are found incidentally on X-rays. About 90 to 95% of the lesion is found in metaphysics of long bones. The cyst is centered, oblong in shape along the long axis of a long bone. Rarely, they are large and multicameral and are found in diaphysis. When fracture is present, there may be a small bone fragment migrated in the cystic fluid. This is called "fallen fragment sign" which is diagnostic of unicameral bone cyst. Besides, a bubble migrating upwards (known as "rising bubble sign") is another feature suggesting of unicameral bone cyst.

=== Computerized tomography (CT) Scan ===
CT scan shows a thin-walled lesion with pseudo septum (incomplete septum or a septum with perforations that allows communications between two chambers). CT scan is used to assess cyst wall thickness and risk of fracture.

=== Magnetic Resonance Imaging (MRI) ===
Magnetic resonance imaging scans are used to identify the precise location of the cyst, to see how aggressive the disease is, and to determine the actual shape and size. The MRI uses a combination of magnets and radio-frequencies to produce various detailed, computerized images of the cyst and its surrounding body structures.

=== Bone scans ===
a nuclear imaging method to evaluate any degenerative and/or arthritic changes in the joints; to detect bone diseases and tumors; to determine the cause of bone pain or inflammation. This test is to rule out other cysts (which are quite unusual)

== Treatment ==
If there is a high probability of a fracture resulting from the unicameral bone cyst, then surgical treatment is necessary. Specific methods can be determined by the physician based upon the patient's age, medical history, tolerance for certain medical procedures or medicine, health, and extremity of the disease, however, the evidence to support one treatment option over another is very weak. The treatment can involve or incorporate one or more of the following surgical methods, which are performed by a pediatric orthopedic surgeon:

- Curettage:

Surgeons create an incision or opening in the bone to drain out the fluids inside the cyst. After the fluid is drained, a curette is used to scrape the lining tissue out of the lesion.

- Bone Grafting:

Bone grafting is proceeded with after curettage; the empty cavity is transplanted with donor bone tissue, bone chips taken from another bone, or artificial material.

- Steroid injection:

An injection of methylprednisolone acetate into the lesion helps reduce the levels of prostaglandin. Prostaglandin is a fatty acid that reduces cyst's ability to be reabsorbed into the bone. To begin an operation using steroids, biopsy needles are placed into the cyst and the interstitial fluids are drained. The cyst is then filled with radiographic contrast to determine the volume and shape of the cyst. If the cyst can be filled, it will be injected with methylprednisolone acetate in several intervals for a time span of six to twelve months. Once the level of prostaglandin decreases, the cyst will be reabsorbed into the bone and disappear. Treatments using steroid injections are preferred over curettage, but there are few risks from the method, which are limited to infection, fracture, and reappearance of the cyst.

If a person needs to be treated with surgery, a standard surgical procedure would be called for; the person would be resting in Fowler's position, a semi-sitting position, under general anesthesia. The exact size, shape, and distance between the acromion to the midpoint of the cyst are measured by a digital radiograph or MRI scan. A small, longitudinal skin incision, about 1 cm long, is made at the center of the cyst. Next, by using a trephine or drill bit, a small aperture is made inside the incision. Fluids contained in the cyst are drained and curved, metal impactors are used to break any septa, or membranes, within the cyst. Curettes are then used to remove the entire cyst from the diaphysis. After the removal of the cystic membrane, a 95% ethanol solution is injected into the cavity to produce a chemical cauterization to burn away any residual active membrane for 30 seconds and then aspirated. Saline solution is then immediately injected into the cavity to wash out any residual ethanol solution and to mitigate any damage to healthy tissue; this irrigation process of ethanol and saline solutions is repeated for another 2 to 3 times. A curved impactor is inserted into the cavity and used to penetrate the boundary between the cyst and bone marrow; the intentional penetrations will allow bone marrow cells to migrate into the cavity to produce a source of osteoinductive cells, cells that induce bony growth. Furthermore, the cavity is completely filled with bone graft substitute, such as calcium sulfate. Finally, one cannulated screw is placed into the aperture.
