= AFHS =

AFHS may refer to:

- Agua Fria High School, Avondale, Arizona, US
- American Falls High School, American Falls, Idaho, US
- American Fork High School, American Fork, Utah, US
- Apex Friendship High School, Apex, North Carolina, US
- Austintown-Fitch High School, Austintown, Ohio, US
- Al fondo hay sitio

== See also ==
- AFH (disambiguation)
