= Valerie Horsley =

American cell and developmental biologist

Valerie Horsley is an American cell and developmental biologist. She currently works as an associate professor at Yale University, where she has extensively researched the growth, restoration, and maintenance of skin cells. She is a currently a member of the Yale Cancer Center and Yale Stem Cell Center. She received a Presidential Early Career Award for Scientists and Engineers in 2012 and in 2013 she was the recipient of the Rosalind Franklin Young Investigator Award.

== Early life and education ==
Valerie Horsley was raised by a single mother, who was working toward her doctorate in industrial engineering throughout her early childhood. Horsley was often placed in the care of graduate students, who served as her babysitters. She initially considered a career in medicine working as a physician, but opted to pursue a career in research instead. In 1998, Horsley achieved a Bachelor of Science in biology at Furman University, and later her doctorate from Emory University in 2003.

== Career ==
The research Horsley explored throughout the duration of her doctorate degree, which was supervised by Grace Pavlath, focused on the transcription factors involved in the development of skeletal muscle tissue. The lab that Horsley worked in discovered that smaller muscles in mice were associated with a lack of transcription factor NFATc2. She was able to determine that factor NFATc2 was a foundational component that allotted myoblast cells to fuse and develop muscle fibers. She also found that NFATc2 factor regulates the transcription of a cytokine, IL-4.

Horsley later decided to shift away from muscle research to complete her postdoctoral training under the guidance of Elaine Fuchs at Rockefeller University. It was during this process that she investigated the factors that influence stem cell development in the skin, specifically the transcription of factor Blimp-1. After finding that eliminating the gene that encoded Blimp-1 led to oily skin in mice, Horsley discovered that Blimp-1 monitors the size of the sebaceous gland.

In 2009, Horsley joined the faculty of Yale University and was promoted to an associate professor of dermatology in 2011, as well as the Maxine F. Singer '57 Assistant Professor of Molecular, Cellular and Developmental Biology.

== Current research ==
In her Yale laboratory, Horsley has studied the cellular and molecular pathways involved in skin tissue development and maintenance, as well as the relationship between fat cells in the skin, wound healing, regeneration of hair follicles, and the formation of keratinocytes during embryonic development. Horsley currently studies adult stem cells in epithelial skin tissue and how these cells contribute to wound healing and the development of cancer, using the mouse as a genetic model system.

Horsley revolutionized the field of epithelial stem cell biology by identifying skin adipocyte stem cells, establishing a major role for these progenitor cells in regulating turnover, rejuvenation and wound repair of the skin epidermis and hair follicles. She found that within epithelial tissues, cells tend to confine to distinct micro-environments. Mechanisms of adipocyte cells in tissue homeostasis and regeneration are not well understood. Horsley discovered the source of both fat cells and immune cells as local signals, as the hormone signal, prolactin, is responsible for stem cell activity and the regeneration of skin cells. Together, her laboratory also found that cell differentiation of adipocytes and hair growth occur simultaneously, and when the cell differentiation process (adipogenesis) ceases, hair growth stops and the follicles deteriorate. Her team identified specific adipose progenitors in the skin, which indicated the necessity of these cells to sufficiently induce hair follicle growth. These cells are activated after injury and are required for fibroblast migration during the wound healing process. The Horsley laboratory discovered that aging causes the loss of dermal adipocyte precursor cells regeneration, and therefore requires Pdgf signaling. Furthermore, adipocytes stem cells can form myofibroblasts after skin injury that generate extracellular matrix proteins and crosslink collagen and these cells are stimulated by macrophage-derived signaling proteins. Her research provides a link between the communication of various cells which lead to hair growth and wound healing, revealing a framework for the possible regulation of tissue repair and the development of various diseases.

Mechanical forces are known to regulate the development, homeostasis and regeneration of multicellular tissues. To illustrate the mechanics involved in skin function, Horsley with E. Dufresne, used traction force microscopy to discover the physical properties of epithelial cell clusters. Using genetics, function-blocking antibodies and mathematical modeling, their work revealed the significance of physical cohesion through cadherin molecules with the coordination of mechanical force throughout multicellular clusters. Together with M. King, they identified a role of nuclear-cytoskeletal adhesion during the growth of the hair follicle. They found that inner nuclear membrane proteins of the Sun family are required for the process of keratinocyte adhesion and hair follicle structure through regulation of the cytoskeleton.

== Awards ==
In 2008, Horsley was a regional finalist in the Blavatnik Awards for Young Scientists.

In 2012, Horsley received the Presidential Early Career Award for Scientists and Engineers for her research of skin cell generation. Also in 2012, she was one of two recipients and received the Rosalind Franklin Young Investigator Award, presented every three years by the Genetics Society of America and the American Society of Human Genetics to two top women scientists in the field of genetics.

In 2016, Horsley received the Montagna Lecture Award from the Society of Investigative Dermatology.

In 2018, Horsley received the Graduate Division in Biomedical and Biological Sciences Distinguished Alumnus award from Emory University.

Horsley's work and lab are supported by federal funding from the National Institutes of Health.

== Public service ==
After realizing the lack of scientists in political decision making, Horsley made her first run for elected office in 2018, running for state senate in CT. She lost the three-way Democratic primary to Jorge Cabrera.

Horsley was elected to Hamden's legislative council in CT in 2019, winning the 4th district.

== Controversy ==
In 2020, Horsley was involved in a Twitter feud.

In 2021, Horsley had a dispute with fellow Hamden councilmember Justin Farmer, when she asked that he address her as "doctor", which was requested by the Hamden Council President a few months earlier in solidarity with Jill Biden. Her resignation was requested but Horsley finished her term.

Despite this political opposition, Horsley has actively supported diversity in science as a founding co-Chair of Society of Investigative Dermatology's Diversity Committee.
