= Hyalinizing clear cell carcinoma =

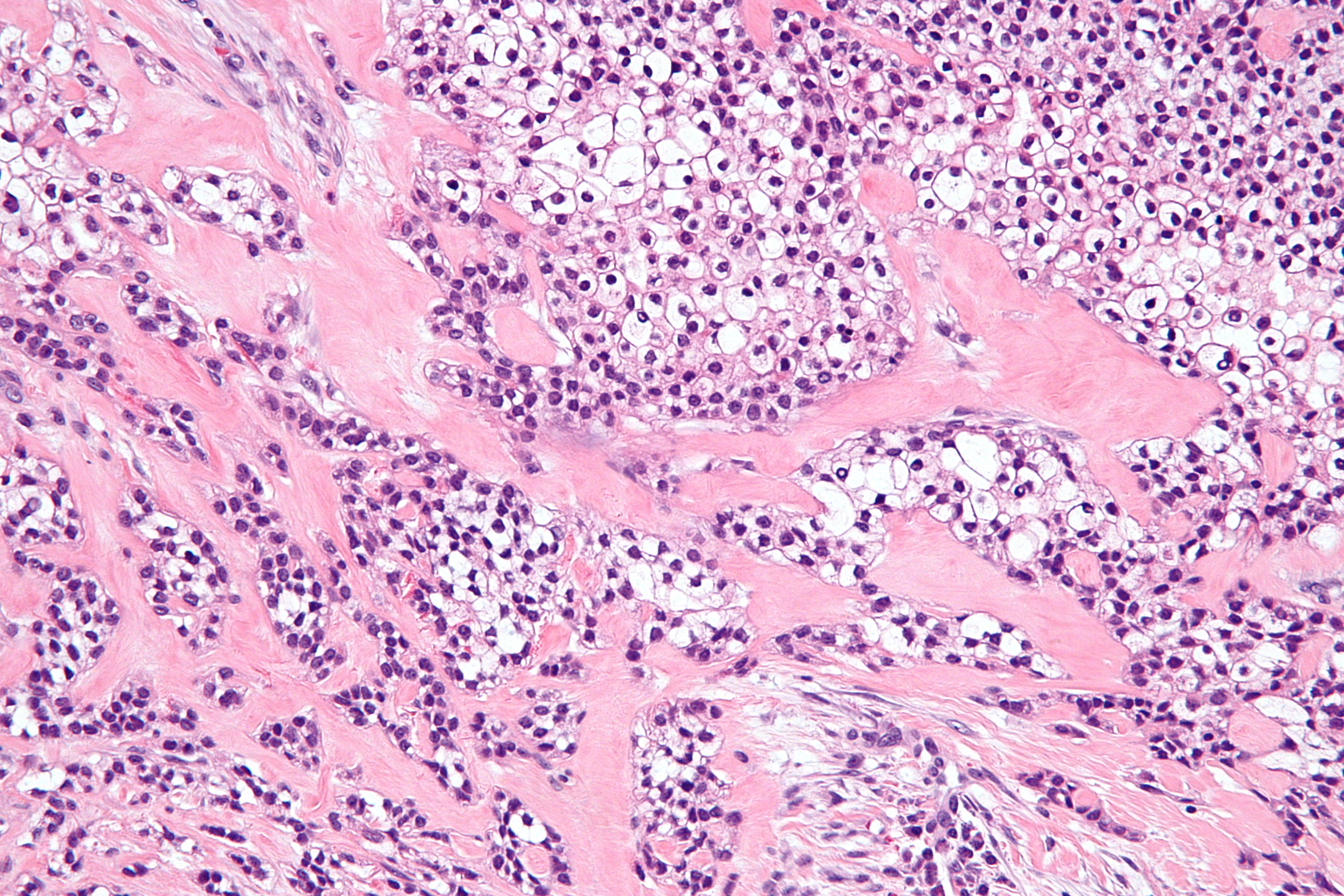
- Micrograph of a hyalinizing clear cell carcinoma showing the characteristic clear cells and surrounding hyalinized stroma. H&E stain.
- Specialty: Oncology, ENT surgery

Hyalinizing clear cell carcinoma (HCCC) is a rare malignant salivary gland tumour, with a good prognosis, that is usually found on the tongue or palate.

== Signs and symptoms ==
HCCCs typically present as a painless mass in the mouth.

== Diagnosis ==
HCCCs are diagnosed by examination of tissue, e.g. a biopsy.

=== Pathology ===
HCCC consist of cells with abundant clear cytoplasm, arranged in cords, trabeculae or clusters in a hyalinized stroma. Nuclear pleomorphism is usually minimal and mitoses are infrequently seen.

Owing to their glycogen content, which explains the "clear" appearance under the microscope, tumour cells stain with PAS. Immunostains for S100 and smooth muscle actin (SMA) are typically negative, but positive for cytokeratins and epithelial membrane antigen (EMA).

HCCCs typically have a recurrent chromosomal translocation, t(12;22), involving the genes EWSR1 and ATF1. The same translocation is seen in clear cell sarcoma.

The histologic differential diagnosis includes mucoepidermoid carcinoma (clear cell variant), acinic cell carcinoma (clear cell variant), epithelial-myoepithelial carcinoma and metastatic clear cell carcinoma.

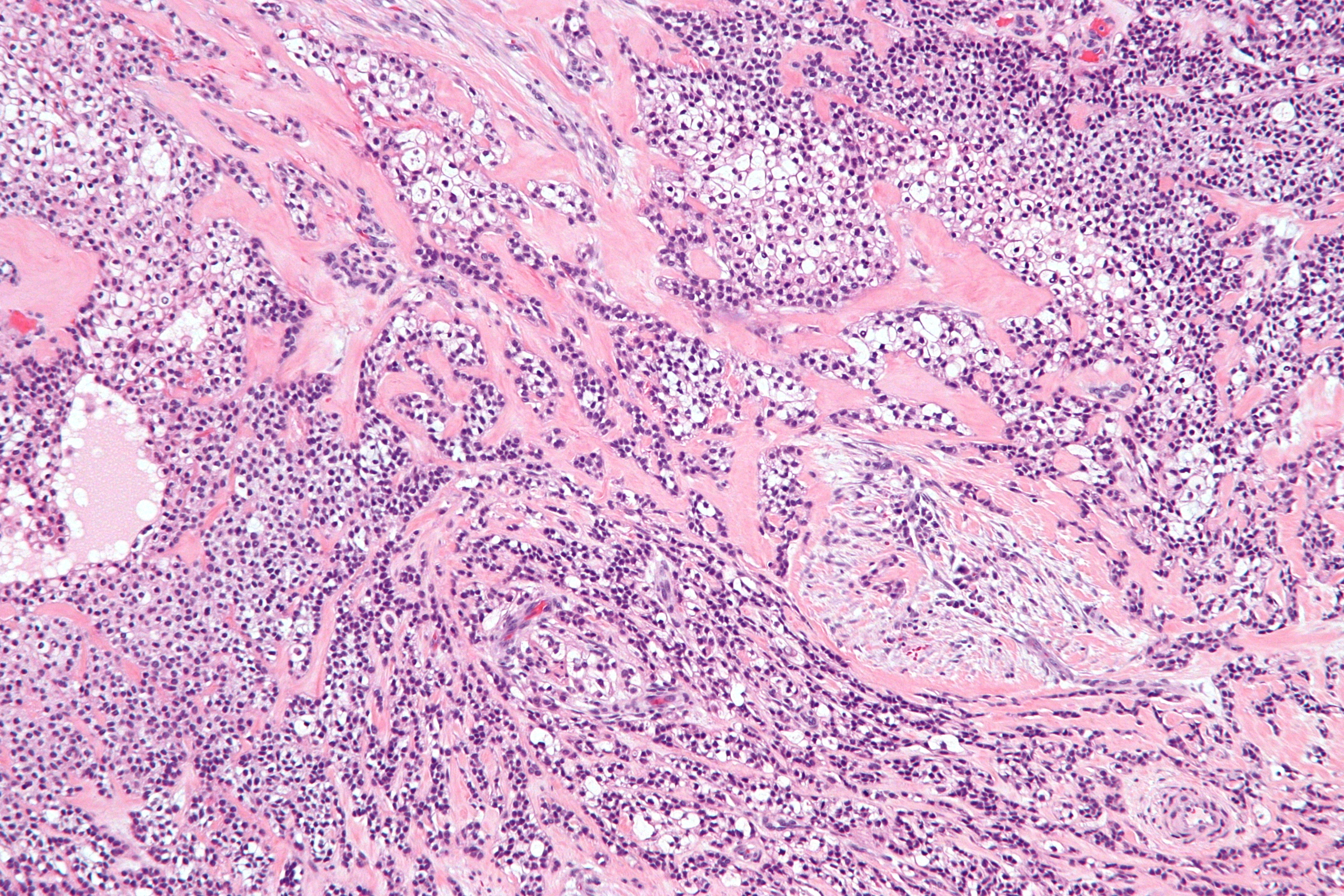
Intermed. mag.

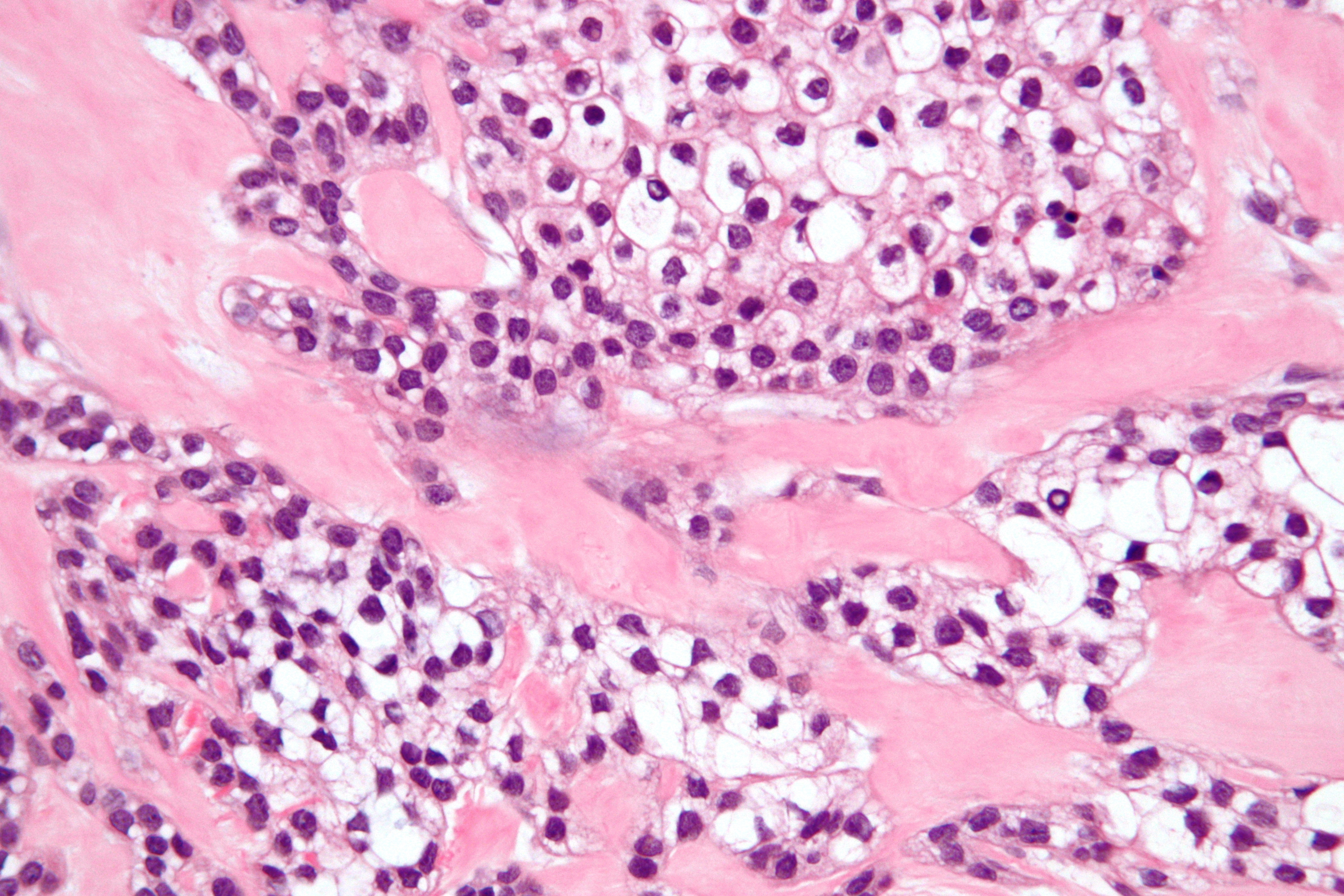
Very high mag.

== Prognosis ==
They generally have a good prognosis.

== See also ==
- Clear cell renal cell carcinoma – Type of kidney cancer
