= AFH =

AFH or afh may refer to:

- Adaptive frequency-hopping spread spectrum, a radio technology
- Adult foster home, residence for elderly or physically disabled adults
- Afrihili language (ISO 639-3 code: afh)
- Angiomatoid fibrous histiocytoma, a human tumour
- Architecture for Humanity, a charitable organization
- Action for Happiness, a charity in the UK
