= Clear-cell sarcoma of the kidney =

- Specialty: Oncology, nephrology

Clear cell sarcoma of the kidney (CCSK) is an extremely rare type of kidney cancer comprising 3% of all pediatric renal tumours. Clear cell sarcoma of the kidney can spread from the kidney to other organs, most commonly the bone, but also including the lungs, brain, and soft tissues of the body.

Despite the similarities in names, clear cell sarcoma of the kidney is unrelated to clear cell sarcoma of soft tissue, also known as melanoma of soft parts.

== Signs and symptoms ==
Typical gross features include large size (mean diameter 11.3 cm), a mucoid texture, foci of necrosis, and prominent cyst formation.

== Cause ==
Research in 2005 showed that CCSK can arise within a renal mesenchymal cell that shows a wide variety of neural markers. Typical presentation is between 1 and 4 years of age, and a 2:1 male-to-female ratio is observed.

== Treatment ==
2004 research showed that CCSK patients exhibit an improved relapse-free survival from a longer course of therapy when using vincristine, doxorubicin, and dactinomycin, but their long-term survival is unchanged compared with patients receiving 6 months of therapy.
