= Mir-590 microRNA precursor family =

Short RNA molecule

mir-590

Identifiers
- Symbol: mir-590
- Rfam: RF00928
- miRBase family: MIPF0000418

Other data
- RNA type: microRNA
- Domain(s): Eukaryota;
- PDB structures: PDBe

In molecular biology mir-590 microRNA is a short RNA molecule. MicroRNAs function to regulate the expression levels of other genes by several mechanisms.

== Nicotine-induced atrial remodelling ==
Downregulation of miR-590 by nicotine has been found to play a key part in the generation of atrial fibrosis by atrial structural remodelling. This downregulation sees the removal of post-transcriptional repression of TGF-β1 and TGF-β receptor type II (TGF-βRII), and consequent collagen production. miR-590 downregulation has further been shown to be mediated by activation of alpha-7 nicotinic acetylcholine receptors (α7-nAChRs).

== See also ==
- MicroRNA
