= Mucin 4 =

Protein-coding gene in the species Homo sapiens

MUC4

Identifiers
- Aliases: MUC4, ASGP, HSA276359, MUC-4, mucin 4, cell surface associated
- External IDs: OMIM: 158372; GeneCards: MUC4

Gene location (Human)
Chr.	Chromosome 3 (human)
Band	3q29	Start	195,746,765 bp
Band	3q29	End	195,811,973 bp
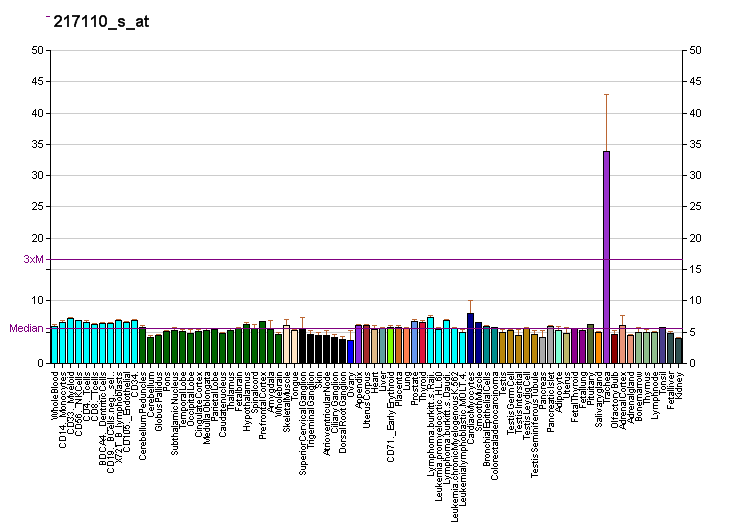

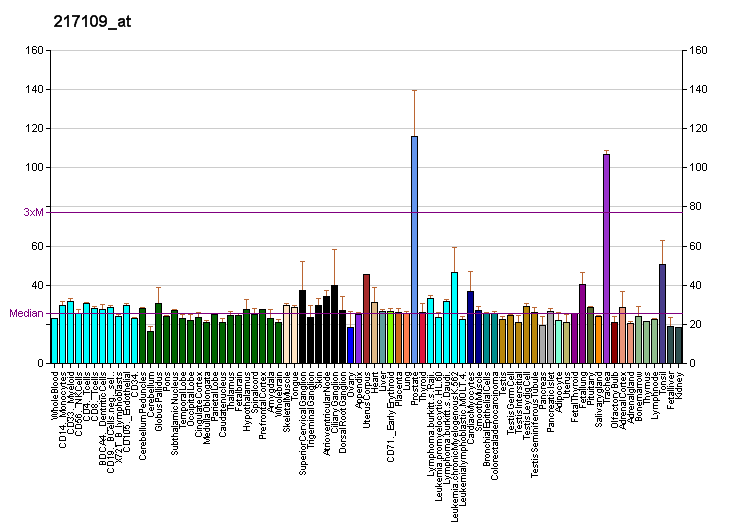

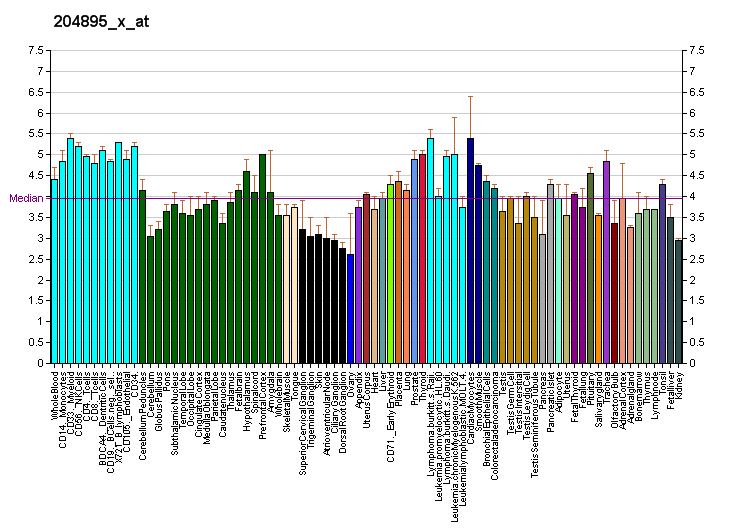
RNA expression pattern
Bgee	Human / Mouse (ortholog); Top expressed in: olfactory zone of nasal mucosa; nasal epithelium; mucosa of transverse colon; palpebral conjunctiva; epithelium of nasopharynx; bronchial epithelial cell; mucosa of sigmoid colon; mucosa of pharynx; urethra; rectum / n/a; More reference expression data
BioGPS	More reference expression data
Gene ontology
Molecular function	extracellular matrix constituent, lubricant activity; ErbB-2 class receptor binding
Cellular component	Golgi lumen; extracellular region; integral component of membrane; vesicle; integral component of plasma membrane; extracellular exosome; membrane; extracellular space; plasma membrane; extracellular matrix
Biological process	cell-matrix adhesion; cell adhesion; maintenance of gastrointestinal epithelium; O-glycan processing; stimulatory C-type lectin receptor signaling pathway; regulation of signaling receptor activity; epithelial structure maintenance
Sources:Amigo / QuickGO
Orthologs
Databases	NCBI: entry; OMA: entry
Species	Human	Mouse
Entrez	4585	n/a
Ensembl	ENSG00000278468; ENSG00000145113; ENSG00000273822; ENSG00000278303; ENSG00000273984 ENSG00000276613; ENSG00000277585; ENSG00000275164	n/a
UniProt	Q99102	n/a
RefSeq (mRNA)	NM_138299; NM_004532; NM_018406; NM_138297; NM_138298 NM_001322468	n/a
RefSeq (protein)	NP_001309397; NP_004523; NP_060876; NP_612154	n/a
Location (UCSC)	Chr 3: 195.75 – 195.81 Mb	n/a
PubMed search		n/a
- Wikidata
View/Edit Human

Mucin-4 (MUC-4) is a mucin protein that in humans is encoded by the MUC4 gene. Like other mucins, MUC-4 is a high-molecular weight glycoprotein.

The major constituents of mucus, the viscous secretion that covers epithelial surfaces such as those in the trachea, colon, and cervix, are highly glycosylated proteins called mucins. These glycoproteins play important roles in the protection of the epithelial cells and have been implicated in epithelial renewal and differentiation. This gene encodes an integral membrane glycoprotein found on the cell surface, although secreted isoforms may exist. At least two dozen transcript variants of this gene have been found, although for many of them the full-length transcript has not been determined or they are found only in tumor tissues.

MUC-4 has been found to play various roles in the progression of cancer, particularly due to its signaling and anti-adhesive properties which contribute to tumor development and metastasis. It is also found to play roles in other diseases such as endometriosis and inflammatory bowel disease. MUC-4 belongs to the human mucin family that is membrane-anchored and can range in molecular weight from 550 to 930 kDa for the actual protein, and up to 4,650 kDa with glycosylation.

== Structure ==
MUC4 is an O-glycoprotein that can reach up to 2 micrometers outside the cell. MUC4 mucin consists of a large extracellular alpha subunit that is heavily glycosylated and a beta subunit that is anchored in the cell membrane and extends into the cytosol. This beta subunit is considered an oncogene, whose role in cancer is increasingly being recognized particularly due to its involvement in signalling pathways, particularly with ErbB2 (Her2). This subunit serves as a ligand for ErbB2, which is suggested to cause the repression of apoptosis found in many cancer cells.

The large alpha subunit that is glycosylated likely confers the anti-adhesive properties to the cell, allowing for cell–cell and cell–matrix detachment in normal as well as cancerous cells. The heavy glycosylation may also serve as a reservoir for growth factors, which may become released upon degradation.

The two subunits of MUC4 are transcribed from a single gene made of 25 exons and with its exon/intron structure identical to that of the mouse gene. Over 24 splice variants have been found for MUC4 using commercial mRNAs or total RNAs extracted from cancer cell lines. Some predicted forms are soluble, while others are membrane bound. However, most of these splice variants are likely artefactual. Many polymorphisms are observed in the tandem repeat region of the alpha subunit, which has a variable number of repeats.

== Function ==
=== Normal ===
In normal functioning, MUC-4 is known to play anti-adhesive roles in the body, such as in lubricating the reproductive lining. It is also found in the respiratory tract - particularly in the trachea and lung - and the digestive tract - in the esophagus and colon - as well as in the visual and auditory systems. In these roles, MUC-4 serves to protect and lubricate the epithelium, which facilitates transport and traps foreign particles. One example of its function in the reproductive lining relates to blastocyst implantation resulting from MUC4 downregulation. It is found to be overexpressed during the luteal phase of menstruation. MUC-4 may also have a role in fetal morphogenic development. MUC-4 is not found in the gallbladder, pancreas, or liver except in abnormal conditions such as cancer. MUC-4, however, may normally be found in bodily fluids like saliva, tears, and milk. In the soluble form, MUC-4 appears to lubricate the epithelial mucosa.

=== Disease ===
MUC-4 is thought to play a role in cancer progression by repressing apoptosis and consequently increasing tumor cell proliferation. The molecular mechanism is thought to be through a MUC-4 complex with ERBB2 receptors, which alters downstream signaling and down regulates CDKN1B. The beta subunit of MUC-4 appears to serve as a ligand that causes the phosphorylation of ErbB2, but does not activate the MAPK or AKT pathways. MUC-4 may also affect HER2 signaling, and result in its stabilization. As a mucin, MUC-4 also alters adhesive properties of the cell. When overexpressed, the disorganization of mucins may reduce adhesion to other cells as well as the extracellular matrix, promoting cancer cell migration and metastasis.

== Role in cancer ==
=== Pancreatic ===
MUC4 is often overexpressed in pancreatic adenocarcinomas and has been shown to promote tumor growth and metastasis, though the mechanism by which it does so is not known. MUC4 detection is emerging as a method to diagnose pancreatic cancer, especially since MUC4 is not detectably expressed in normal pancreas and increased expression of MUC-4 suggests a greater progression of the disease. Scientists have recently experimented with MUC4 inhibition in pancreatic cancer using drug delivery methods such as microRNAs. Such efforts have been successful at reducing EGF receptor expression, its downstream signaling, and consequently malignant behavior of the cancer cell such as migration, invasion, and cell detachment.

Bile acids have been found to stimulate carcinogenesis in pancreatic ductal adenocarcinoma cells through increased expression of MUC4.

=== Esophageal ===
MUC4 expression in esophageal cancer often leads to increased tumor proliferation and migration. Like with prostate cancer, increased expression of MUC4 suggests greater development of esophageal cancer. Bile acids present in gastroesophageal reflux disease are thought to contribute to this over-expression of MUC4. By inhibiting MUC-4, scientists have been able to reduce cancer cell proliferation, migration, and tumor size as well as reduce protein S100A4 expression, presenting MUC-4 as a good therapeutic target for the treatment of esophageal cancer.

=== Breast ===
Unlike pancreatic and esophageal cancers, MUC4 expression is suppressed in the primary tumor when compared to normal cells. It, however, is found to be overexpressed in lymph node metastases. The initial reduction in MUC-4 appears to promote the transition to the primary tumor, but its subsequent increase in expression facilitate metastasis and ultimately increased malignancy

=== Other ===
MUC4 is found to be overexpressed in papillary thyroid carcinoma, and could serve as a potential marker of malignancy and prognosis. MUC-4 is also found to be a very sensitive and specific marker in low-grade fibromyxoid sarcoma.

== Role in other diseases ==
MUC-4 is also relevant to several other disease conditions. Polymorphisms in the MUC4 gene have been found to play a role in the progression of endometriosis and related infertility, as well as dysplastic cervical disorders. MUC-4 also has important roles in inflammatory bowel disease such as Crohn's disease and is found to be overexpressed in ulcerative colitis.
