= Mir-129 microRNA precursor family =

mir-129 microRNA precursor family
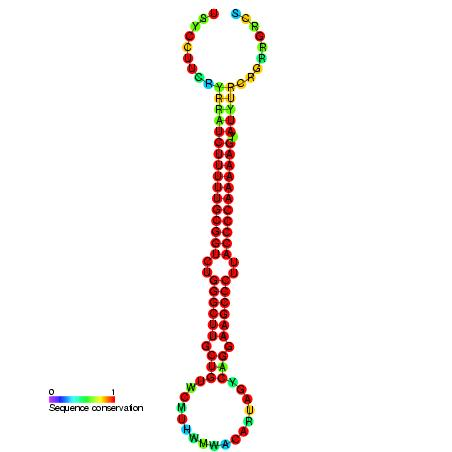
- Predicted secondary structure and sequence conservation of mir-129

Identifiers
- Symbol: mir-129
- Rfam: RF00486
- miRBase: MI0000252
- miRBase family: MIPF0000073

Other data
- RNA type: Gene; miRNA
- Domain: Eukaryota
- GO: GO:0035195 GO:0035068
- SO: SO:0001244
- PDB structures: PDBe

The miR-129 microRNA precursor is a small non-coding RNA molecule that regulates gene expression. This microRNA was first experimentally characterised in mouse and homologues have since been discovered in several other species, such as humans, rats and zebrafish. The mature sequence is excised by the Dicer enzyme from the 5' arm of the hairpin. It was elucidated by Calin et al. that miR-129-1 is located in a fragile site region of the human genome near a specific site, FRA7H in chromosome 7q32, which is a site commonly deleted in many cancers. miR-129-2 is located in 11p11.2.

== Expression Patterns ==
miR-129 seems to have a tissue specific expression pattern localised to the brain in normal humans. This finding was identified initially by microarray experimentation with mouse tissue (and more specifically to the cerebellum) which was subsequently validated by the expression profiling in human tissue. However, expression in normal brain tissue was found to be relatively low and different profiling experimentation methodologies produced differing results. These differences and the low levels of detection may be attributed to the size and complexity of the human brain and the fact that specific regions of the brain were not individually tested.

== Targets of miR-129 ==
=== Cdk6 ===
As with many other microRNAs, the expression profile of miR-129 changes with the onset of cancer. In many different tumour cell lines, such as gastric cancer, medulloblastoma and endometrial cancer, lung andeocarcinoma and colorectal carcinoma, there are lower levels of miR-129 indicating that it may play a role in the suppression of cell growth. There is evidence to suggest that miR-129 directly targets Cdk6, cyclin dependant kinase 6- a cell proliferation regulator. This is due to the effects of the down regulation of miR-129 in cancer cells resulting in their proliferation. Conversely in the over expression of miR-129, proliferation of endometrial tumour cells is significantly reduced via the down regulation of Cdk6.

=== SOX4 ===
SOX4, SRY-related HMG box 4 gene – an oncogene that is known to be deregulated in a number of cancers, is another target of miR-129 in which the aberrant regulation of miR-129 contributes to the proliferation of cancer cell lines. SOX4 is involved in the mediation of transcription response to Wnt signalling. In endometrial cancers and gastric cancers, there has been a clear link established between the epigenetic repression, or loss, of miR-129 and the over-expression of SOX4. In experiments where miR-129 levels were returned to normal in cancer cells, SOX4 expression was down regulated. Further, it has been suggested that promoter hypermethylation of miR-129-2 is the main contributor of SOX4 over expression in some types of cancer.

=== GALNT1 ===
GALNT1, N-acetylgalactosaminyltransferase 1 – involved in TGF-β signalling, is another target of miR-129 that was identified by luciferase assay. It was observed that when cancer cells were subjected to transfection with the precursor of miR-129, GALNT1 was subsequently down regulated by the direct targeting of miR-129. The SOX4 target observation was also validated in this study. These results correlate with the notion that high levels of miR-129 and low SOX4 and GALNT1 levels correlate to cancer cell progression.

=== APC and Rab11 ===
Adenomatous polyposis coli (APC), a tumour suppressor gene controlled by Wnt signalling and involved in proliferation, and Rab11 have also been identified as miR-129 targets from a RT-PCR experiment of the expression profiles of human esophageal squamous cell carcinoma (ESCC) . This study shows the over expression of miR-129 may play a part in the development of ESCC. This may be due to the possible suppression of signal transduction pathways via APC and Rab11.

=== EIF2C3 and CAMTA1 ===
miR-129 may also play a role in hematopoietic stem cell development. It has been shown that miR-129 may participate in a stem cell developmental network with EIF2C3 (eukaryotic translation initiation factor 2C, 3) and CAMTA1 (calmodulin binding transcription activator 1) with the induction of cell differentiation. It is postulated that miR-129 may affect differentiation and the cell cycle regulation by inhibiting CAMTA1 translation.

== Clinical Relevance of miR-129 ==
=== Biomarkers for Diagnostics ===
MicroRNAs have given cancer researchers a new perspective to understand and combat cancer. This is due to them being produced in a tissue-specific manner and their roles in many aspects of cellular process, such as proliferation and apoptosis. The vast amount of experimental data has enabled the specific microRNA signatures and profiles to be recognised and thus used as potential biomarkers in cancer diagnosis, therapy prediction and prognosis.

miR-129 has been identified as a potential candidate for development into a diagnostic biomarker. This is because of its integral role it plays in the proliferation of cells and its many recognisable, statistically significant and independent interactions with its targets as observed by the expression profiles in the study carried out by Ogawa et al..
