= Clear cell sarcoma =

Rare form of cancer

- Other names: Malignant melanoma of the soft parts
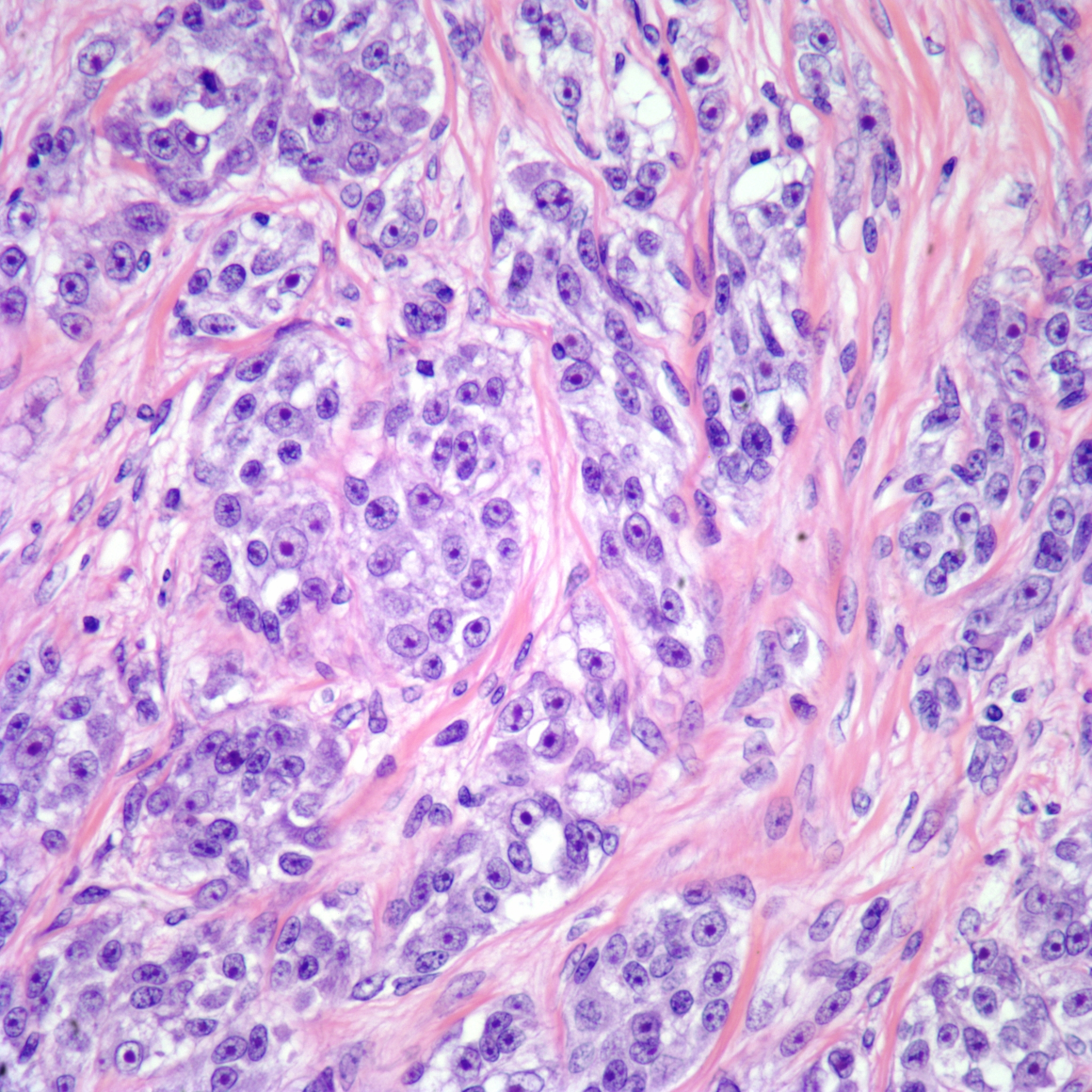
- Clear cell sarcoma. Tumor cells with prominent nucleoli and clear cytoplasm are arranged in well-defined nests surrounded by dense fibrous stroma.
- Specialty: Oncology

Clear cell sarcoma is a sub-type of a rare form of cancer called a sarcoma. It is known to occur mainly in the soft tissues and dermis. Rare forms were thought to occur in the gastrointestinal tract before they were discovered to be different and redesignated as gastrointestinal neuroectodermal tumors.

Recurrence is common.

Clear cell sarcoma's neoplastic cells express the EWSR1-ATF1 fusion gene in a majority of cases or a EWSR1-CREB1, EWSR1-CREM, or EWSR1-DDIT3 fusion gene in a small subset of cases (see FET gene family of fusion genes).

Clear cell sarcoma of the soft tissues in adults is not related to the pediatric tumor known as clear cell sarcoma of the kidney.

== Signs and symptoms ==
It presents as a slow growing mass that especially affects tendons and aponeuroses and it is deeply situated. Patients often perceive it as a lump or hard mass. It causes either pain or tenderness but only until it becomes large enough. This kind of tumor is commonly found in the extremities, especially around the knee, feet and ankle. Patients diagnosed with clear cell sarcoma are usually between the ages of 20 and 40.

== Pathology ==
Despite the name clear cell sarcoma, the tumor cells do not necessarily need to have clear cytoplasm. The lesion has a distinctly nested growth pattern with a mixture of spindle, epithelioid and tumor giant cells. Approximately two thirds of the tumors contain melanin pigment. Clear cell sarcoma, similar to melanoma, has consistent positivity for S-100, HMB-45, and MITF.

== Diagnosis ==
Imaging studies such as X-rays, computed tomography (CT) scans, or MRI may be required to diagnose clear-cell sarcoma together with a physical exam. Normally a biopsy is also necessary. Furthermore, a chest CT, a bone scan, and positron emission tomography (PET) may be part of the tests in order to evaluate areas where metastases occur.

== Treatment ==
Treatment depends upon the site and the extent of the disease. Clear cell sarcoma is usually treated with surgery in the first place in order to remove the tumor. The surgical procedure is then followed by radiation and sometimes chemotherapy. Few cases of clear cell sarcoma respond to chemotherapy. Several types of targeted therapy that may be of benefit to people with clear cell sarcoma are currently under investigation. Directly targeting the fusion proteins in clear cell sarcoma has been challenging due to their unstructured nature. Recent proteomics studies have identified protein arginine methyltransferase 5 (PRMT5) as a druggable vulnerability in clear cell sarcoma. Preclinical studies have supported that PRMT5 inhibitor JNJ64619178 is an emerging therapeutic option for clear cell sarcoma, which remains to be evaluated in the clinic.

== Prognosis ==
When the tumor is large and there is presence of necrosis and local recurrence, the prognosis is poor. Presence of metastasis occurs in more than 50% cases and the common places of its occurrence are the bone, lymph node and lungs. Five-year survival rates, which are reported to be between 50 and 65%, can be misleading because the disease is prone to late metastasis or recurrence. Ten and twenty-year survival rates are 33% and 10%, respectively.

== See also ==
- Melanoma
- Clear-cell sarcoma of the kidney
- List of cutaneous conditions
- Hyalinizing clear cell carcinoma - has the same chromosomal translocation
