= ATF1 =

Protein-coding gene in humans

Identifiers
- Aliases: ATF1, EWS-FUS/ATF-1, TREB36, activating transcription factor 1
- External IDs: OMIM: 123803; MGI: 3037720; GeneCards: ATF1

Gene location (Human)
| Chr. | Chromosome 12 (human) |
| Band | 12q13.12 | Start | 50,763,710 bp |
| Band | 12q13.12 | End | 50,821,162 bp |

Gene location (Mouse)
| Chr. | X chromosome (mouse) |
| Band | X|X A5 | Start | 52,885,578 bp |
| Band | X|X A5 | End | 52,886,387 bp |
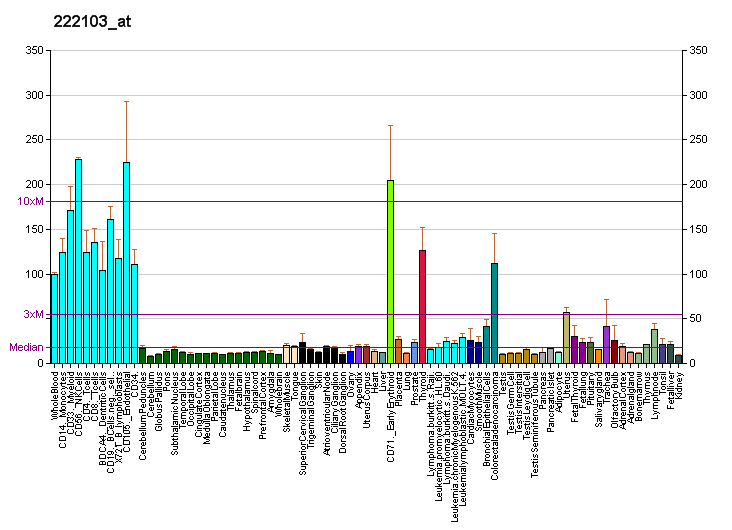
RNA expression pattern
| Bgee | Human / Mouse (ortholog); Top expressed in: germinal epithelium; Skeletal muscle tissue of rectus abdominis; parietal pleura; amniotic fluid; biceps brachii; Skeletal muscle tissue of biceps brachii; visceral pleura; trabecular bone; palpebral conjunctiva; Achilles tendon / Top expressed in: embryo; lens; testicle; striatum of neuraxis; liver; heart; cerebellum; More reference expression data |
| BioGPS | More reference expression data |
Gene ontology
| Molecular function | DNA binding; sequence-specific DNA binding; RNA polymerase II transcription regulatory region sequence-specific DNA binding; DNA-binding transcription factor activity; DNA-binding transcription activator activity, RNA polymerase II-specific; protein binding; protein heterodimerization activity; transcription factor activity, RNA polymerase II distal enhancer sequence-specific binding; identical protein binding; DNA-binding transcription factor activity, RNA polymerase II-specific; protein-containing complex binding |
| Cellular component | ATF1-ATF4 transcription factor complex; transcription regulator complex; nucleoplasm; nucleus |
| Biological process | regulation of transcription, DNA-templated; response to organic cyclic compound; transcription, DNA-templated; positive regulation of DNA replication; positive regulation of neuron projection development; response to cobalt ion; positive regulation of transcription by RNA polymerase II; transcription by RNA polymerase II; regulation of transcription by RNA polymerase II |
Sources:Amigo / QuickGO
Orthologs
| Databases | NCBI: entry; OMA: entry |
| Species | Human | Mouse |
| Entrez | 466 | 100040260 |
| Ensembl | ENSG00000123268 | ENSMUSG00000080968 |
| UniProt | P18846 | n/a |
| RefSeq (mRNA) | NM_005171 | XM_036162179 |
| RefSeq (protein) | NP_005162 | n/a |
| Location (UCSC) | Chr 12: 50.76 – 50.82 Mb | Chr X: 52.89 – 52.89 Mb |
| PubMed search |
- Wikidata
| View/Edit Human | View/Edit Mouse |

Cyclic AMP-dependent transcription factor ATF-1 is a protein that in humans is encoded by the ATF1 gene.

This gene encodes an activating transcription factor, which belongs to the ATF subfamily and bZIP (basic-region leucine zipper) family. It influences cellular physiologic processes by regulating the expression of downstream target genes, which are related to growth, survival, and other cellular activities. This protein is phosphorylated at serine 63 in its kinase-inducible domain by serine/threonine kinases, cAMP-dependent protein kinase A, calmodulin-dependent protein kinase I/II, mitogen- and stress-activated protein kinase and cyclin-dependent kinase 3 (cdk-3). Its phosphorylation enhances its transactivation and transcriptional activities, and enhances cell transformation.

== Clinical significance ==
Fusion of this gene and FUS on chromosome 16 or EWSR1 on chromosome 22 induced by translocation generates chimeric proteins in angiomatoid fibrous histiocytoma and clear cell sarcoma. This gene has a pseudogene on chromosome 6.

== See also ==
- Activating transcription factor

== Interactions ==
ATF1 has been shown to interact with:

- BRCA1,
- CSNK2A2,
- CSNK2A1, and
- EWS.
