= ETV1 =

Protein-coding gene in the species Homo sapiens

Identifiers
- Aliases: ETV1, ER81, ETS variant 1, ETS variant transcription factor 1
- External IDs: OMIM: 600541; MGI: 99254; GeneCards: ETV1
Available structures
PDB	Ortholog search: PDBe RCSB
PDB	List of PDB id codes 4AVP, 4BNC

Gene location (Human)
Chr.	Chromosome 7 (human)
Band	7p21.2	Start	13,891,229 bp
Band	7p21.2	End	13,991,425 bp

Gene location (Mouse)
Chr.	Chromosome 12 (mouse)
Band	12 A3|12 17.99 cM	Start	38,829,379 bp
Band	12 A3|12 17.99 cM	End	38,920,483 bp
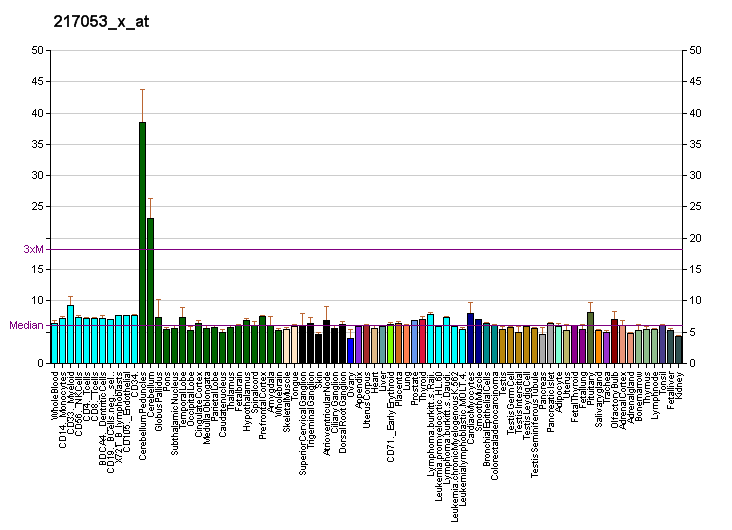

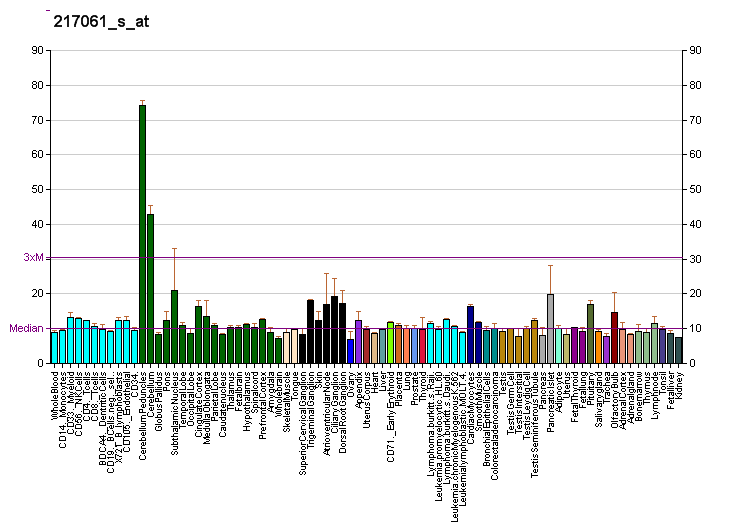

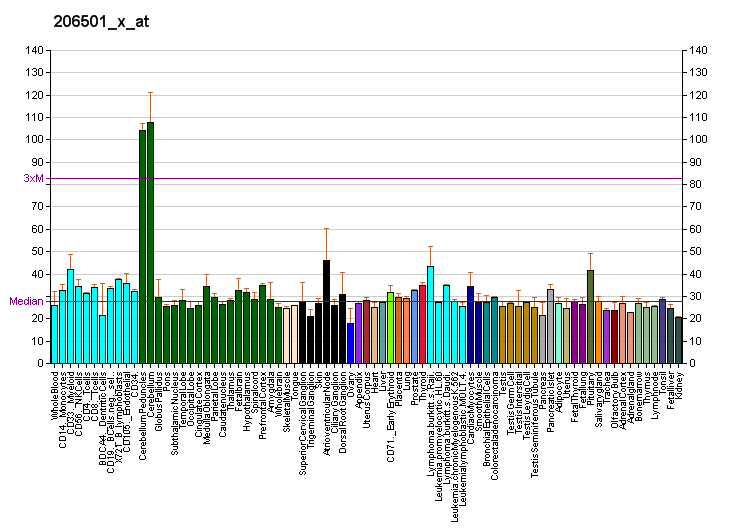
RNA expression pattern
Bgee	Human / Mouse (ortholog); Top expressed in: cerebellar vermis; parotid gland; cerebellar hemisphere; right hemisphere of cerebellum; visceral pleura; lower lobe of lung; lateral nuclear group of thalamus; paraflocculus of cerebellum; right ventricle; ventricular zone / Top expressed in: parotid gland; lobe of cerebellum; cerebellar vermis; habenula; subiculum; submandibular gland; lacrimal gland; internal pyramidal layer of neocortex; olfactory bulb; Rostral migratory stream; More reference expression data
BioGPS	More reference expression data
Gene ontology
Molecular function	DNA-binding transcription factor activity; RNA polymerase II cis-regulatory region sequence-specific DNA binding; DNA binding; sequence-specific DNA binding; DNA-binding transcription activator activity, RNA polymerase II-specific; protein binding; DNA-binding transcription factor activity, RNA polymerase II-specific
Cellular component	nucleus
Biological process	positive regulation of transcription, DNA-templated; peripheral nervous system neuron development; mechanosensory behavior; muscle organ development; regulation of transcription, DNA-templated; transcription by RNA polymerase II; transcription, DNA-templated; positive regulation of transcription by RNA polymerase II; axon guidance; regulation of transcription by RNA polymerase II; cell differentiation
Sources:Amigo / QuickGO
Orthologs
Databases	NCBI: entry; OMA: entry
Species	Human	Mouse
Entrez	2115	14009
Ensembl	ENSG00000006468	ENSMUSG00000004151
UniProt	P50549	P41164
RefSeq (mRNA)	NM_001163147; NM_001163148; NM_001163149; NM_001163150; NM_001163151 NM_001163152; NM_004956; NM_001370555; NM_001370556	NM_001163154; NM_007960; NM_001347379
RefSeq (protein)	NP_001156619; NP_001156620; NP_001156621; NP_001156622; NP_001156623 NP_001156624; NP_004947; NP_001357484; NP_001357485	NP_001156626; NP_001334308; NP_031986
Location (UCSC)	Chr 7: 13.89 – 13.99 Mb	Chr 12: 38.83 – 38.92 Mb
PubMed search
- Wikidata
View/Edit Human	View/Edit Mouse

ETS translocation variant 1 is a protein that in humans is encoded by the ETV1 gene.
