= Angiomatoid fibrous histiocytoma =

Type of tumor which affects children and adolescents

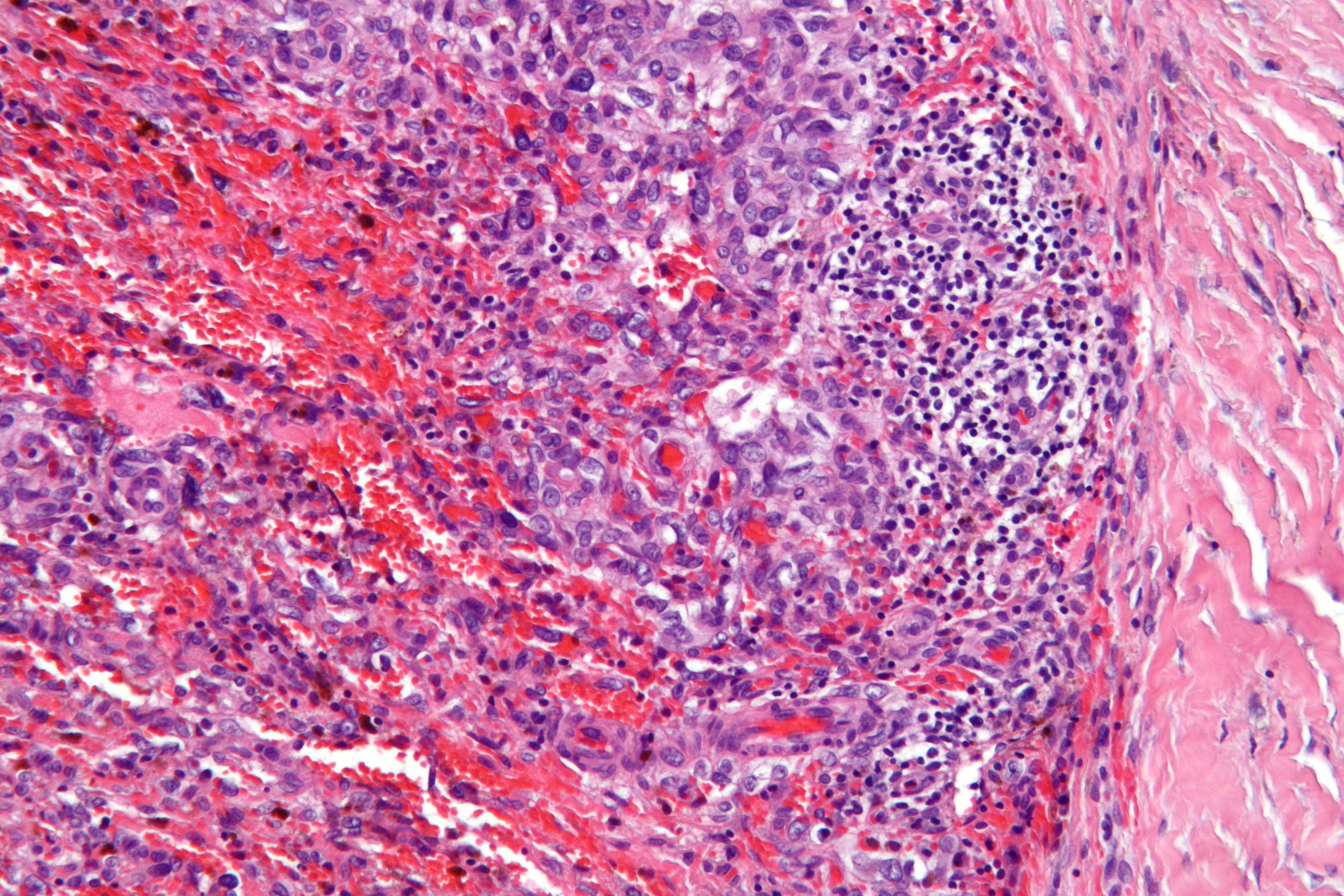
- Micrograph showing an angiomatoid fibrous histiocytoma. H&E stain.

Angiomatoid fibrous histiocytoma (AFH) is a rare soft tissue cancer that affects children and young adults.

== Pathology ==
It is characterized by cystic blood-filled spaces and composed of histiocyte-like cells. A lymphocytic cuff is common. It often simulates a vascular lesion, and was initially described as doing this.

AFH typically has a chromosomal translocation involving the ATF1 gene -- t(12;16) FUS/ATF1 or t(12;22) EWS/ATF1.

== See also ==
- Granulomatous inflammation
- Vascular tumor
