= CREB3L1 =

Protein-coding gene in the species Homo sapiens

Identifiers
- Aliases: CREB3L1, OASIS, cAMP responsive element binding protein 3-like 1, cAMP responsive element binding protein 3 like 1, OI16
- External IDs: OMIM: 616215; MGI: 1347062; GeneCards: CREB3L1

Gene location (Human)
Chr.	Chromosome 11 (human)
Band	11p11.2	Start	46,277,662 bp
Band	11p11.2	End	46,321,409 bp

Gene location (Mouse)
Chr.	Chromosome 2 (mouse)
Band	2|2 E1	Start	91,812,673 bp
Band	2|2 E1	End	91,854,847 bp
RNA expression pattern
Bgee	Human / Mouse (ortholog); Top expressed in: nasal epithelium; stromal cell of endometrium; mucosa of ileum; myocardium of left ventricle; body of pancreas; mucosa of paranasal sinus; pylorus; right ventricle; apex of heart; rectum / Top expressed in: calvaria; parotid gland; molar; submandibular gland; membranous bone; left colon; choroid plexus of fourth ventricle; yolk sac; long bone; Dermatocranium; More reference expression data
BioGPS	n/a
Gene ontology
Molecular function	DNA binding; DNA-binding transcription factor activity; DNA-binding transcription activator activity, RNA polymerase II-specific; chromatin binding; protein binding; cAMP response element binding; SMAD binding; DNA-binding transcription factor activity, RNA polymerase II-specific; DNA-binding transcription repressor activity, RNA polymerase II-specific
Cellular component	integral component of membrane; endoplasmic reticulum membrane; endoplasmic reticulum; nucleus; membrane
Biological process	negative regulation of endoplasmic reticulum stress-induced intrinsic apoptotic signaling pathway; regulation of transcription, DNA-templated; extracellular matrix constituent secretion; positive regulation of transcription from RNA polymerase II promoter in response to endoplasmic reticulum stress; transcription, DNA-templated; multicellular organism development; endoplasmic reticulum unfolded protein response; response to unfolded protein; osteoblast differentiation; positive regulation of transcription by RNA polymerase II; transcription by RNA polymerase II; positive regulation of collagen biosynthetic process; negative regulation of transcription by RNA polymerase II; negative regulation of gene expression; negative regulation of fibroblast growth factor receptor signaling pathway; negative regulation of transcription, DNA-templated; negative regulation of sprouting angiogenesis
Sources:Amigo / QuickGO
Orthologs
Databases	NCBI: entry; OMA: entry
Species	Human	Mouse
Entrez	90993	26427
Ensembl	ENSG00000157613	ENSMUSG00000027230
UniProt	Q96BA8	Q9Z125
RefSeq (mRNA)	NM_052854	NM_011957
RefSeq (protein)	NP_443086	NP_036087
Location (UCSC)	Chr 11: 46.28 – 46.32 Mb	Chr 2: 91.81 – 91.85 Mb
PubMed search
- Wikidata
View/Edit Human	View/Edit Mouse

CAMP responsive element binding protein 3 like 1, also known as OASIS, is a responsive element binding protein that in humans is encoded by the CREB3L1 gene.

== Function ==
The protein encoded by this gene is normally found in the membrane of the endoplasmic reticulum (ER). However, upon stress to the ER, the encoded protein is cleaved, and the released cytoplasmic transcription factor domain translocates to the nucleus. There it activates the transcription of target genes by binding to box-B elements. [provided by RefSeq, Jun 2013].

== Implications in disease ==
Pathogenic variants in CREB3L1 have been linked to Osteogenesis Imperfecta.
