= NFATC2 =

Protein-coding gene in the species Homo sapiens

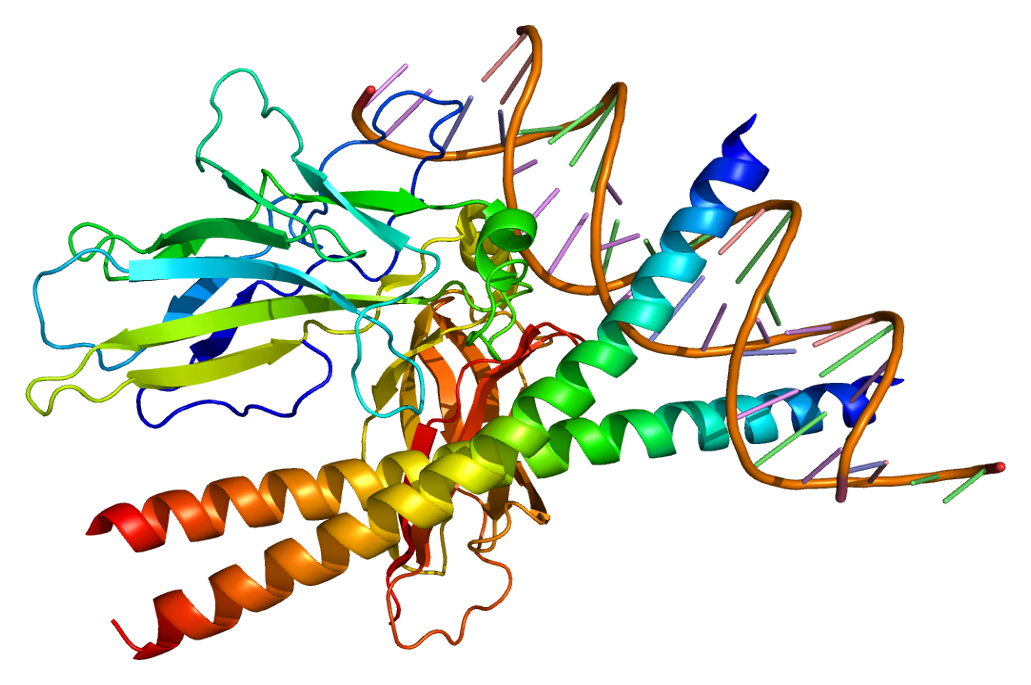

Identifiers
- Aliases: NFATC2, NFAT1, NFATP, nuclear factor of activated T-cells 2, nuclear factor of activated T cells 2
- External IDs: OMIM: 600490; MGI: 102463; GeneCards: NFATC2
Available structures
PDB	Ortholog search: PDBe RCSB
PDB	List of PDB id codes 1A02, 1OWR, 1P7H, 1PZU, 2AS5, 2O93, 3QRF

Gene location (Human)
Chr.	Chromosome 20 (human)
Band	20q13.2	Start	51,386,957 bp
Band	20q13.2	End	51,562,831 bp

Gene location (Mouse)
Chr.	Chromosome 2 (mouse)
Band	2 H3|2 88.91 cM	Start	168,318,330 bp
Band	2 H3|2 88.91 cM	End	168,443,577 bp
RNA expression pattern
Bgee	Human / Mouse (ortholog); Top expressed in: vena cava; synovial joint; synovial membrane; nipple; buccal mucosa cell; pylorus; tendon of biceps brachii; cartilage tissue; saphenous vein; skin of arm / Top expressed in: lumbar subsegment of spinal cord; motor neuron; substantia nigra; ankle; condyle; facial motor nucleus; stroma of bone marrow; soleus muscle; mesenteric lymph nodes; Epithelium of choroid plexus; More reference expression data
BioGPS	n/a
Gene ontology
Molecular function	DNA binding; sequence-specific DNA binding; DNA-binding transcription factor activity; DNA-binding transcription activator activity, RNA polymerase II-specific; transcription factor binding; chromatin binding; RNA polymerase II cis-regulatory region sequence-specific DNA binding; DNA-binding transcription repressor activity, RNA polymerase II-specific; protein binding; transcription cis-regulatory region binding; phosphatase binding; DNA-binding transcription factor activity, RNA polymerase II-specific
Cellular component	cytoplasm; transcription regulator complex; nucleoplasm; nucleus; cytosol; ribonucleoprotein complex
Biological process	B cell receptor signaling pathway; regulation of transcription, DNA-templated; cytokine production; calcineurin-NFAT signaling cascade; negative regulation of transcription by RNA polymerase II; transcription by RNA polymerase II; myotube cell development; transcription, DNA-templated; cellular response to DNA damage stimulus; positive regulation of transcription, DNA-templated; Fc-epsilon receptor signaling pathway; positive regulation of myoblast fusion; positive regulation of gene expression; positive regulation of B cell proliferation; cell migration; positive regulation of transcription by RNA polymerase II; regulation of regulatory T cell differentiation; negative regulation of vascular associated smooth muscle cell differentiation
Sources:Amigo / QuickGO
Orthologs
Databases	NCBI: entry; OMA: entry
Species	Human	Mouse
Entrez	4773	18019
Ensembl	ENSG00000101096	ENSMUSG00000027544
UniProt	Q13469	Q60591
RefSeq (mRNA)	NM_001136021; NM_001258292; NM_001258294; NM_001258295; NM_001258296 NM_001258297; NM_012340; NM_173091	NM_001037177; NM_001037178; NM_001136073; NM_001291168; NM_001291169 NM_001291170; NM_001291171; NM_001291172; NM_001291173; NM_001291174; NM_001291175; NM_001291176; NM_001291177; NM_001291178; NM_001291179; NM_010899
RefSeq (protein)	NP_001129493; NP_001245221; NP_001245223; NP_001245224; NP_001245225 NP_001245226; NP_036472; NP_775114	NP_001032254; NP_001032255; NP_001129545; NP_001278097; NP_001278098 NP_001278099; NP_001278100; NP_001278101; NP_001278102; NP_001278103; NP_001278104; NP_001278105; NP_001278106; NP_001278107; NP_001278108; NP_035029
Location (UCSC)	Chr 20: 51.39 – 51.56 Mb	Chr 2: 168.32 – 168.44 Mb
PubMed search
- Wikidata
View/Edit Human	View/Edit Mouse

Nuclear factor of activated T-cells, cytoplasmic 2 is a protein that in humans is encoded by the NFATC2 gene.

== Function ==
This gene is a member of the nuclear factor of activated T cells (NFAT) family. The product of this gene is a DNA-binding protein with a REL-homology region (RHR) and an NFAT-homology region (NHR). This protein is present in the cytosol and only translocates to the nucleus upon T cell receptor (TCR) stimulation, where it becomes a member of the nuclear factors of activated T cells transcription complex. This complex plays a central role in inducing gene transcription during the immune response. Alternate transcriptional splice variants, encoding different isoforms, have been characterized.

== Clinical significance ==
Translocation forming an in frame fusions product between EWSR1 gene and the NFATc2 gene has been described in bone tumor with a Ewing sarcoma-like clinical appearance. The translocation breakpoint led to the loss of the controlling elements of the NFATc2 protein and the fusion of the N terminal region of the EWSR1 gene conferred constant activation of the protein.

== Interactions ==
NFATC2 has been shown to interact with MEF2D, EP300, IRF4 and Protein kinase Mζ. Prostaglandin F2alpha stimulates a NFCT2 pathway stimulating growth of skeletal muscle cells.
