= Gastrointestinal neuroectodermal tumor =

Gastrointestinal Neuroectodermal Tumor (GNET)
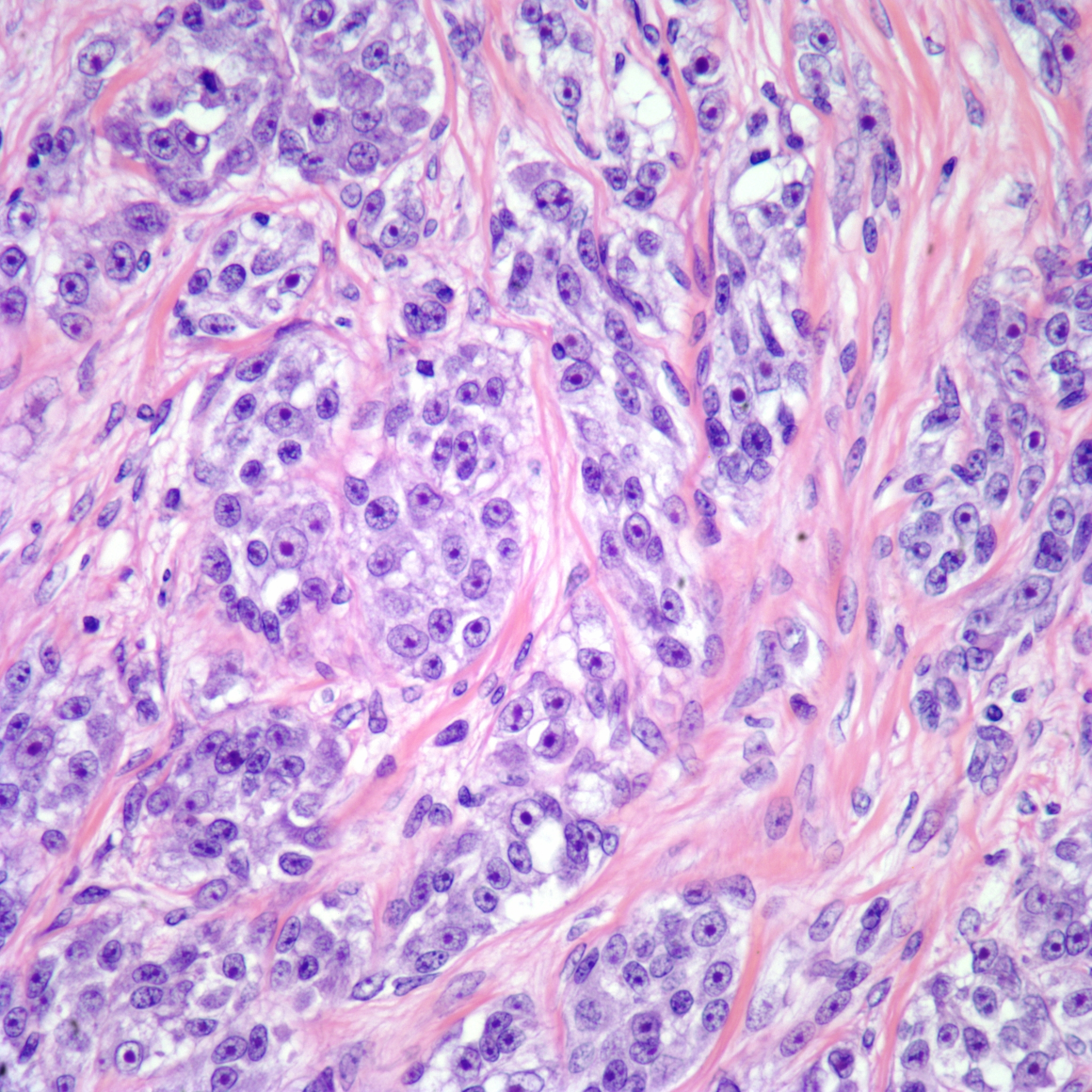
- GNET. Tumor cells with prominent nucleoli and clear cytoplasm are arranged in well-defined nests surrounded by dense fibrous stroma with admixed giant cells.

A gastrointestinal neuroectodermal tumor is a neuroectodermal tumor that appears in the gastrointestinal system.
