= Mammary analogue secretory carcinoma =

Salivary gland neoplasm

Mammary analogue secretory carcinoma (MASC), also termed MASC_{SG}, (the "SG" subscript indicates salivary gland) is a salivary gland neoplasm. It is a secretory carcinoma which shares the microscopic pathologic features with other types of secretory carcinomas including mammary secretory carcinoma, secretory carcinoma of the skin, and salivary gland–type carcinoma of the thyroid. MASC_{SG} was first described by Skálová et al. in 2010. The authors of this report found a chromosome translocation in certain salivary gland tumors, i.e. a (12;15)(p13;q25) fusion gene mutation. The other secretory carcinoma types carry this fusion gene.

== Fusion gene ==
The translocation found in MASC_{SG} occurs between the ETV6 gene located on the short arm (designated p) of chromosome 12 at position p13.2 (i.e. 12p13.2) and the NTRK3 gene located on the long arm (designated q) of chromosome 15 at position q25.3 (i.e. 15q25.3) to create the (12;15)(p13;q25) fusion gene, ETV6-NTRK3. This mutant fusion gene also occurs in congenital fibrosarcoma, congenital mesoblastic nephroma, secretory breast cancer (also termed juvenile breast cancer), acute myelogenous leukemia, ALK-negative Inflammatory myofibroblastic tumour, and radiation-induced papillary thyroid carcinoma. The MASC_{SG} gene codes for the transcription factor protein, ETV6, which suppresses the expression of, and thereby regulates, various genes that in mice are required for normal hematopoiesis as well as the development and maintenance of the vascular network.

The NTRK3 gene codes for Tropomyosin receptor kinase C (also termed TrkC or TEL), the receptor for neurotrophin-3. TrkC is a RTK class VII tyrosine kinase receptor. When bound to neurotrophin-3, it becomes active as a tyrosine kinase to phosphorylate cellular proteins and thereby stimulate cell signaling pathways that lead to cellular differentiation and growth while inhibiting cellular death. TrkC makes particularly important contributions to development of the central and peripheral nervous systems. NTRK3 forms chromosomal translation-mediated fusions with many other genes in addition to ETV6 to form fused genes that are associated with the induction of a wide range of cancers including those of the lung, thyroid gland, colon, rectum, and brain.

ETV6-NTRK3 fusion genes in some MASC_{SG} disease cases display atypical exon junctions and may be associated with more tissue infiltrating disease and less favorable clinical outcomes.

== Fusion protein ==
The ETV6-NTRK3 fusion gene's product, ETV6-NTRK3 protein, contains the N-terminus of ETV6 that is responsible for its dimerization/polymerization ETV6, a step required for it to inhibit transcription. The protein's C-terminus contains the C-terminus of the TrkC. The fusion protein lacks transcription regulating activity but has dysregulated, i.e. continuously active tyrosine kinase activity. In consequence of the latter effect, the fusing protein continuously stimulates pro-growth and pro-survival pathways and thereby the malignant growth of its parent cells.

== Clinical presentation and diagnosis ==
Mammary analogue secretory carcinoma occurs somewhat more commonly in men (male to female ratio of <1.5:1.0). Patients with this disease have a mean age of 46 years although ~12% of cases occur in pediatric patients. Individuals typically present with symptomless tumors in the parotid salivary gland (68%), buccal mucosa salivary glands (9%), submandibular salivary gland (8%) or in the small salivary glands of the lower lip (5%), upper lip (4%), and hard palate (4%). Histologically, these tumors are described as having a morphology similar to secretory breast carcinoma; they typically having one or more of the following histological patterns: microcystic, papillary-cystic, follicular, and/or solid lobular. Other histological features of these tissues include: the presence of eosinophilic secretions as detected by staining strongly for eosin Y; positive staining with periodic acid-Schiff stain (often after diastase); the presence of vesicular oval nuclei with a single small but prominent nucleolus; and the absence of basophilic Haematoxylin or zymogen granules (i.e. vesicles that store enzymes near the cell's plasma membrane).

The cited histology features are insufficient to distinguish MASC_{SG} from other Salivary gland neoplasms such as acinic cell carcinoma, low-grade cribriform cystadenocarcinoma, and adenocarcinoma not otherwise specified. MASC_{SG} can be distinguished from these and other histologically similar tumors by either tissue identification of a) the ETV6-NTRK3 fusion gene using Fluorescence in situ hybridization or reverse transcription polymerase chain reaction gene detection methods or b) a specific pattern of marker proteins as registered using specific antibody-based detection methods, i.e. MASC_{SG} tissue should have detectable S100 (a family of calcium binding proteins), Mammaglobin (a breast cancer marker), Keratin 7 (an intermediate filament found in epithelial cells), GATA3 (a transcription factor and breast cancer biomarker), SOX10 (a transcription factor important in neural crest origin cells and development of the peripheral nervous system), and STAT5A (a transcription factor) but lack antibody-detectable TP63 (a transcription factor in the same family as p53) and Anoctamin-1 (a voltage sensitive calcium activated chloride channel).

== Clinical course and treatment ==
MASC_{SG} is currently treated as a low-grade (i.e. Grade 1) carcinoma with an overall favorable prognosis. These cases are treated by complete surgical excision. However, the tumor does have the potential to recur locally and/or spread beyond surgically dissectible margins as well as metastasize to regional lymph nodes and distant tissues, particularly in tumors with histological features indicating a high cell growth rate potential. One study found lymph node metastasis in 5 of 34 MASC_{SG} patients at initial surgery for the disease; these cases, when evidencing no further spread of disease, may be treated with radiation therapy. The treatment of cases with disease spreading beyond regional lymph nodes has been variable, ranging from simple excision to radical resections accompanied by adjuvant radiotherapy and/or chemotherapy, depending on the location of disease. Mean disease-free survival for MASC_{SG} patients has been reported to be 92 months in one study.

The tyrosine kinase activity of NTRK3 as well as the ETV6-NTRK3 protein is inhibited by certain tyrosine kinase inhibitory drugs such as Entrectinib and LOXO-101; this offers a potential medical intervention method using these drugs to treat aggressive MASC_{SG} disease. Indeed, one patient with extensive head and neck MASC_{SG} disease obtained an 89% fall in tumor size when treated with entrectinib. This suppression lasted only 7 months due to the tumor's acquirement of a mutation in the ETV6-NTRK3 gene. The newly mutated gene encoded an entrectinib-reisistant ETV6-NTRK3 protein. Treatment of aggressive forms of MASC_{SG} with NTRK3-inhibiting tyrosine kinase inhibiting drugs, perhaps with switching to another type of tyrosine kinase inhibitor drug if the tumor acquires resistance to the initial drug, is under study.STARTRK-2
