= ETV6 =

Protein-coding gene in the species Homo sapiens

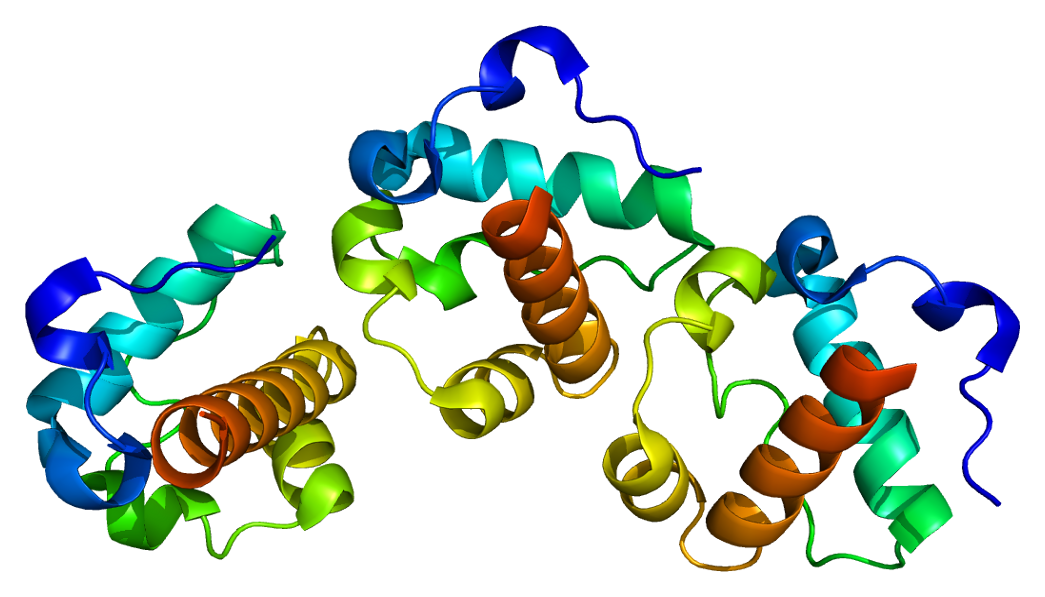

Identifiers
- Aliases: ETV6, TEL, TEL/ABL, THC5, ETS variant 6, ETS variant transcription factor 6
- External IDs: OMIM: 600618; MGI: 109336; GeneCards: ETV6
Available structures
PDB	Ortholog search: PDBe RCSB
PDB	List of PDB id codes 1JI7, 1LKY, 2DAO, 2QAR, 2QB0, 2QB1

Gene location (Human)
Chr.	Chromosome 12 (human)
Band	12p13.2	Start	11,649,674 bp
Band	12p13.2	End	11,895,377 bp

Gene location (Mouse)
Chr.	Chromosome 6 (mouse)
Band	6 G1|6 64.58 cM	Start	134,012,663 bp
Band	6 G1|6 64.58 cM	End	134,247,121 bp
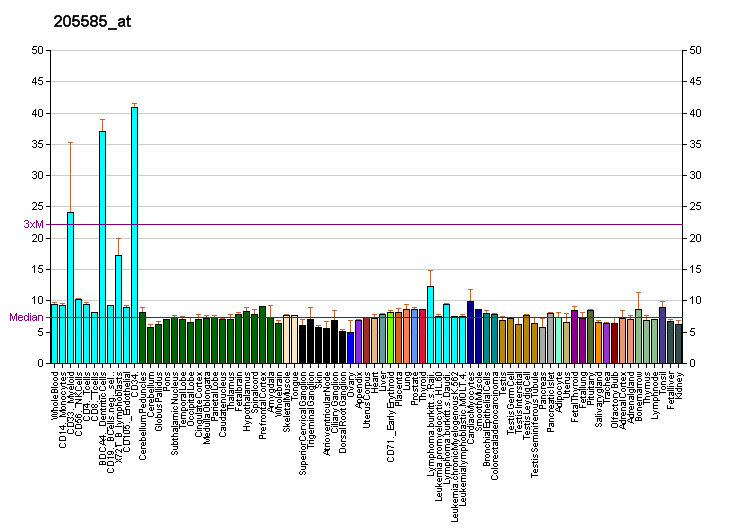
RNA expression pattern
Bgee	Human / Mouse (ortholog); Top expressed in: mucosa of paranasal sinus; parotid gland; lactiferous duct; olfactory zone of nasal mucosa; epithelium of nasopharynx; saphenous vein; monocyte; tibial arteries; minor salivary glands; tonsil / Top expressed in: tail of embryo; genital tubercle; lacrimal gland; cumulus cell; vestibular membrane of cochlear duct; internal carotid artery; external carotid artery; conjunctival fornix; granulocyte; submandibular gland; More reference expression data
BioGPS	More reference expression data
Gene ontology
Molecular function	DNA-binding transcription factor activity; RNA polymerase II cis-regulatory region sequence-specific DNA binding; DNA binding; sequence-specific DNA binding; DNA-binding transcription activator activity, RNA polymerase II-specific; RNA polymerase II transcription regulatory region sequence-specific DNA binding; protein binding; DNA-binding transcription repressor activity, RNA polymerase II-specific; protein domain specific binding; DNA-binding transcription factor activity, RNA polymerase II-specific
Cellular component	nucleolus; nucleus; cytosol
Biological process	hematopoietic stem cell proliferation; cell differentiation; regulation of transcription, DNA-templated; negative regulation of transcription by RNA polymerase II; transcription by RNA polymerase II; positive regulation of transcription by RNA polymerase II; transcription, DNA-templated; vitellogenesis; mesenchymal cell apoptotic process; neurogenesis; regulation of transcription by RNA polymerase II
Sources:Amigo / QuickGO
Orthologs
Databases	NCBI: entry; OMA: entry
Species	Human	Mouse
Entrez	2120	14011
Ensembl	ENSG00000139083	ENSMUSG00000030199
UniProt	P41212	P97360
RefSeq (mRNA)	NM_001987	NM_007961; NM_001303102
RefSeq (protein)	NP_001978	NP_001290031; NP_031987
Location (UCSC)	Chr 12: 11.65 – 11.9 Mb	Chr 6: 134.01 – 134.25 Mb
PubMed search
- Wikidata
View/Edit Human	View/Edit Mouse

ETV6 (i.e. translocation-Ets-leukemia virus) protein is a transcription factor that in humans is encoded by the ETV6 (previously known as TEL) gene. The ETV6 protein regulates the development and growth of diverse cell types, particularly those of hematological tissues. However, its gene, ETV6 frequently suffers various mutations that lead to an array of potentially lethal cancers, i.e., ETV6 is a clinically significant proto-oncogene in that it can fuse with other genes to drive the development and/or progression of certain cancers. However, ETV6 is also an anti-oncogene or tumor suppressor gene in that mutations in it that encode for a truncated and therefore inactive protein are also associated with certain types of cancers. Germline pathogenic variants in ETV6 also cause an autosomal dominant form of inherited thrombocytopenia associated with an increased risk of hematological malignancies.

== Gene ==
The human ETV6 gene is located at position "13.2" on the short (i.e. "p") arm of chromosome 12, i.e. its notated position is 12p13.2. The gene has 8 exons and two start codons, one located at exon 1 at the start of the gene and an alternative located upstream of exon 3. ETV6 codes for a full length protein consisting of 452 amino acids; the gene is expressed in virtually all cell types and tissues. Mice depleted of the ETV6 gene by Gene knockout die between day 10.5 and 11.5 of embryonic life with defective yolk sac angiogenesis and extensive losses in mesenchymal and neural cells due to apoptosis. Other genetic manipulation studies in mice indicate that the gene is required for the development and maintenance of bone marrow-based blood cell formation and the vascular network.

== Protein ==
The human ETV6 protein is a member of the ETS transcription factor family; however, it more often acts to inhibit than stimulate transcription of its target genes. ETV6 protein contains 3 domains: a) the pointed N-terminal (i.e. PNT) domain which forms oligomer partners with itself as well as other transcription factors (e.g. FLI1) and is required for ETV6's transcriptional repressing activity; b) the central regulatory domain; and c) the C-terminal DNA-binding domain, ETS, which binds to the consensus DNA sequence, 5-GGAA/T-3 within a 9-to-10 bp sequence, in the target genes it regulates. ETV6 interacts with other proteins that regulate the differentiation and growth of cells. It binds to and thereby inhibits FLI1, another member of the ETS transcription factor family, which is active in promoting the maturation of blood platelet-forming megakaryocytes and blocking the Cellular differentiation of erythroblasts into red blood cells; this results in the excessive proliferation and abnormal morphology of erythroblasts. ETV6 likewise binds to HTATIP, a histone acetyl transferase that regulates the expression of various genes involved in gene transcription, DNA repair, and cellular apoptosis; this binding promotes the transcription-repressing activity of ETV6.

== Medical significance ==
=== Inherited mutations ===
Rare missense and other loss of function mutations in ETV6 cause thrombocytopenia 5, an autosomal dominant familial disease characterized by variable thrombocytopenia (blood platelet counts from 5% to 90% of normal), mild to modest bleeding tendencies, and bone marrow biopsy findings of abnormal appearing megakaryocytes (i.e. nuclei with fewer than the normal number of lobulations) and red cell macrocytosis. Thrombocytopenia 5 is associated with an increased incidence of developing hematological (e.g. chronic myelomonocytic leukemia, acute myelocytic leukemia, B cell acute lymphoblastic leukemia, mixed phenotype acute leukemia, Myelodysplastic syndrome, and multiple myeloma) and non-hematological (e.g. skin and colon) cancers as well as non-malignant diseases such as refractory anemia myopathies, and gastroesophageal reflux disease.

Two unrelated kindreds were found to have autosomal dominant inherited mutations in the ETV6 gene, one family with a germline DNA substitution termed L349P that lead to replacing leucine with proline at amino acid 349 in the DNA binding domain of the ETV6, the second, termed N385fs, in germline DNA caused the lose of five base pairs ETV6 and a truncated ETV6 protein. Both mutant proteins failed to enter cell nuclei normally and had a reduced capacity to target genes regulated by the normal ETV6 protein. Afflicted members of these families had low platelet counts (i.e. thrombocytopenia) and acute lymphoblastic leukemia. Fifteen members of the two kindreds had thrombocytopenia, five of whom also had acute lymphoblastic leukemia. The L249P kindred also had one family member with renal cell carcinoma and another family member with Duodenal cancer. The relationship of these two cancers to the L249P mutation has not been investigated. In all events these two familial thrombocytopenia syndromes appear distinctly different than the thrombocytopenia 5 syndrome.

==== Treatment ====
Family members with thrombocytopenia 5 need to be regularly monitored with complete blood count and blood smear screenings to detect the early changes brought on by the malignant transformations of this disease into hematological neoplasms. Patients who developed these transformations have generally been treated similarly to patients who have the same hematological neoplasms but on a non-familial basis. Patients developing non-malignant hematological or non-hematological solid tumor manifestations of thrombocytopenia 5 are also treated like to patients with the same but no-familial disease.

The acute lymphoblastic leukemia associated with L349P or N385fs mutations in ETV6 appeared far less sensitive to standard chemotherapy for acute lymphoblastic leukemia with 2 among 3 family members moving rather quickly from chemotherapy to bone marrow transplantation and the third family member expiring. This suggest that these mutation-related forms of acute lymphoblastic leukemia require aggressive therapy.

=== Acquired mutations ===
The ETV6 gene is prone to develop a wide range of acquired mutations in hematological precursor cells that lead to various types of leukemia and/or lymphoma. It may also suffer a smaller number of mutations in non-hematological tissues that leads to solid tumors. These mutations involve chromosome translocations which fuse the ETV6 on chromosome 12's the short (i.e. "p") arm ("q" stands for long arm) at position p13.2 (site notation: 12p12.2) near to a second gene on another chromosome or, more rarely, its own chromosome. This creates a fusion gene of the oncogene category which encodes a chimeric protein that promotes the malignant growth of its parent cells. It may be unclear which portion of the newly formed oncoprotein contributes to the ensuing malignancy but fusions between ETV6 and proteins with tyrosine kinase activity generally are converted from a protein with tightly regulated tyrosine kinase activity to an uncontrolled and continuously active tyrosine kinase that thereby promotes the malignant transformation of its parent cells.

==== Hematological malignancies ====
The following table lists the more frequently occurring genes to which ETV6 fuses, the function of these genes, these genes' chromosomal locations, the notation designating the most common sites of the translocations of these fused genes, and the malignancies resulting from these translocations. These translocation mutations commonly occur in pluripotent hematopoietic stem cells that differentiate into various types of mature hematological cells. Consequently, a given mutation may lead to various types of hematological malignancies. The table includes abbreviations for tyrosine kinase receptor (TK receptor), non-receptor tyrosine kinase (non-receptor TK), homeobox protein type of transcription factor (homeobox protein), acute lymphocytic leukemia (ALL), Philadelphia chromosome negative chronic myelogenous leukemia (Ph(-)CML), myelodysplastic syndrome (MDS), myeloproliferative neoplasm (MPN), and acute myeloid leukemia (AML). The presence of ETV6 gene mutations in myelodysplastic syndromes is associated with shortened survival.

Gene	function	location	notation	malignancies	gene	function	location	notation	malignancies
PDGFRA	TK receptor	4q12	t(4;12)(q27?3;p13)	40% to 50% of clonal eosinophilia patients	PDGFRB	TK receptor	5q32	t(5;12)(q31-33;p13)	rare clonal eosinophilia patients
FLT3	TK receptor	13q12.2	t(12;13)(q13.1;p12.3-13)	rare AML, ALL, and clonal eosinophilia patients	ABL1	non-receptor TK	9q34.12	t(9;12)(q34;p13)	rare AML, B-cell or T-cell ALL, Ph(-)CML patients
RUNX1	transcription factor	21q22.12	t(12;21)(p13;q22)	20-25% of pediatric ALL patients	PAX5	homeobox protein	9p13.2	t(9;12)(q11;p13)	1% of pediatric ALL patients
MNX1	homeobox protein	7q36.3	t(7:12)(q36;p13)	20-30% of pediatric ALL patients less than 18 months old	MECOM	Transcription factor	3q26.2	t(3;12)(q26;p13)	rare MDS, MPN, and AML patients

In addition to the fusion gene-producing translocations given in the table, ETV6 has been reported to fuse with other genes in very rare cases (i.e. 1-10 published reports). These translocations lead to one or more of the same types of hematological malignancies listed in the table. Thus, the ETV6 gene reportedly forms translocation-induced fusion genes with: a) tyrosine kinase receptor gene FGFR3; b) non-receptor tyrosine kinase genes ABL2, NTRK3, JAK2, SYK, FRK, and LYN; c) transcription factor genes MN1 and PER1; d) homeobox protein transcription factor CDX2; e) Protein tyrosine phosphatase receptor-type R gene PTPRR; f) transcriptional coactivator for nuclear hormone receptors gene NCOA2; f) Immunoglobulin heavy chain gene IGH; g) enzyme genes TTL (adds and removes tyrosine residues on α-tubulin), GOT1 (an Aspartate transaminase), and ACSL6 (a Long-chain-fatty-acid—CoA ligase); h) transporter gene ARNT (binds to ligand-bound aryl hydrocarbon receptor to aid in its movement to the nucleus where it promotes the expression of genes involved in xenobiotic metabolism); i) unknown function genes CHIC2, MDS2, FCHO2 and BAZ2A.; and j) non-annotated gene STL (which has no long open reading frame).

At least 9 frameshift mutations in the'ETV6 gene have been associated with ~12% of adult T cell Acute lymphoblastic leukemia cases. These mutations involve insertions or deletions in the gene that lead to its encoding a truncated and therefore inactive ETV6 protein. These mutations commonly occur alongside mutations in another oncogene, NOTCH1, which is associated with T cell acute lymphoblastic lymphoma quite independently of ETV6. It is suggested that suppressor mutations in the ETV6 gene may be a contributing factor in the development ant/or progression of this leukemia type.

===== Treatment =====
Patients developing hematological malignancies secondary to the ETV6 gene fusion to receptor tyrosine kinases and non-receptor tyrosine kinases may be sensitive to therapy with tyrosine kinase inhibitors. For example, patients with clonal eosinophilias due to PDGFRA or PDGFRB fusion genes experience long-term, complete remission when treated with are highly sensitive tyrosine kinase inhibitor, gleevec. Larotrectinib, entrectinib, merestinib, and server other broadly acting tyrosine kinase inhibitors target the NTRK3 gene. Many of these drugs are in phase 1 or phase 2 clinical trials for the treatment of ETV6-NTRK3-related solid tumors and may ultimately prove useful for treating hematologic malignancies associated with this fusion gene. Clinical trials have found that the first generation tyrosine kinase inhibitors sorafenib, sunitinib, midostaurin, lestaurtinib have shown some promise in treating acute myelogenous leukemia associated with the FLT3-TKI fusion gene; the second generation tyrosine kinase inhibitors quizartinib and crenolanib which are highly selective in inhibiting the FLT3 protein, have shown significant promise in treating relapsed and refractory acute myelogenous leukemia related to the FLT3-TKI fusion gene. One patient with ETV6-FLT3-related myeloid/lymphoid neoplasm obtained a short term remission on sunitinib and following relapse, on sorafenib suggesting that the cited FLT3 protein tyrosine kinase inhibitors may prove useful for treating ETV6-FLT-related hematologic malignancies. Two patients suffering hematologic malignancies related to PCM1-JAK2 or BCR-JAK2 fusion genes experienced complete and cytogenetic remissions in response to the tyrosine kinase inhibitor ruxolitinib; while both remissions were short-term (12 months), these results suggest that tyrosine kinase inhibitors that target JAK2 may be of some use for treating hematologic malignancies associated with ETV6-JAK2 fusion stems. An inhibitor of SYK tyrosine kinase, TAK-659 is currently undergoing Phase I clinical trials for advanced lymphoma malignancies and may prove to be useful in treating this disease when associated with the ETV6-SYK fusion gene. It is possible that hematological malignancies associated with ETV6 gene fusions to either the SYK or FRK tyrosine kinase genes may someday be shown susceptible to tyrosine kinase inhibitor therapy. However, children with ETV6-RUNX1-associated acute lymphoblastic leukemia are in an especially good-risk subgroup and therefore have been almost uniformly treated with standard-risk chemotherapy protocols.

Hematological malignancies associated with ETY6 gene fusions to other transcription factor genes appear to reflect a loss or gain in function of ETV6 and/or the other genes in regulating expression of their target genes; this results in the formation or lack of formation of products which influence cell growth, proliferation, and/or survival. In vitro studies of ETV6-RUNX, ETV6-MN1, ETV6-PER1, and ETV6-MECOM fusion genes support this notion. Thus, the ETV6-MECOM fusion gene is overexpressed because it is driven by the promoter derived from ETV6 whereas the ETV6-RUNX, ETV6-MN1, and ETV6-PER1 fusion genes produce chimeric proteins which lack ETV6 protein's gene-suppressing activity. The chimeric protein products of ETV6 gene fusions with ARNT, TTL, BA22A, FCHO2, MDS2, and CHIC2 likewise lack ETV6 protein's transcription factor activity. Gene fusions between ETV6 and the homeobox gens (i.e. CDX2, PAX5, and MNX1) produce chimeric proteins with lack either ETV6s and/or CDX2s, PAX5s or MNX1s transcription factor activity. In all events, hematological malignancies associated with these fusion genes have been treated with standard chemotherapy protocols selected on the basis of the malignancies phenotype.

=== Solid tumors ===
Mutations in the ETV6 gene are also associated with solid tumors. In particular, the ETV6-NTRK3 fusion gene occurs in and is thought or proposed to drive certain types of cancers. These cancers include secretory breast cancer (also termed juvenile breast cancer), mammary analogue secretory carcinoma of the parotid and other salivary glands, congenital fibrosarcoma, congenital mesoblastic nephroma, inflammatory myofibroblastic tumor, and radiation-induced papillary thyroid carcinoma.

==== Treatment ====
The treatment of ETV6 gene-associated solid tumors has not advanced as far as that for ETV6 gene-associated hematological malignancies. It is proposed that tyrosine kinase inhibitors with specificity for NTRK3's tyrosine kinase activity in ETV6-NTRK3 gene-associated solid tumors may be of therapeutic usefulness. Entrectinib, a pan-NTRK as well as an ALK and ROS1 tyrosine kinase inhibitor has been found useful in treating a single patient with ETV6-NRTK3 fusion gene-associated mammary analogue secretory carcinoma and lends support to the clinical development of NTRK3-directed tyrosine kinase inhibitors to treat ETV6-NTRK3 fusion protein associated malignancies. Three clinical trials are in the recruitment phase for determining the efficacy of treating a wide range of solid tumors associated with mutated, overactive tyrosine kinase proteins, including the ETV6-TRK3 protein, with larotrectinib, a non-selective inhibitor of NTRK1, NTRK2, and NTRK3 tyrosine kinases.

== See also ==
- ETV6-NTRK3 gene fusion
- TEL-JAK2
