= ETV6-NTRK3 gene fusion =

Translocation of genetic material

ETV6-NTRK3 gene fusion is the translocation of genetic material between the ETV6 gene located on the short arm (designated p) of chromosome 12 at position p13.2 (i.e. 12p13.2) and the NTRK3 gene located on the long arm (designated q) of chromosome 15 at position q25.3 (i.e. 15q25.3) to create the (12;15)(p13;q25) fusion gene, ETV6-NTRK3. This new gene consists of the 5' end of ETV6 fused to the 3' end of NTRK3. ETV6-NTRK3 therefore codes for a chimeric oncoprotein consisting of the helix-loop-helix (HLH) protein dimerization domain of the ETV6 protein fused to the tyrosine kinase (i.e. PTK) domain of the NTRK3 protein. The ETV6 gene codes for the transcription factor protein, ETV6, which suppresses the expression of, and thereby regulates, various genes that in mice are required for normal hematopoiesis as well as the development and maintenance of the vascular network. NTRK3 codes for Tropomyosin receptor kinase C a NT-3 growth factor receptor cell surface protein that when bound to its growth factor ligand, neurotrophin-3, becomes an active tyrosine kinase that phosphorylates tyrosine residues on, and thereby stimulates, signaling proteins that promote the growth, survival, and proliferation of their parent cells. The tyrosine kinase of the ETV6-NTRK3 fusion protein is dysfunctional in that it is continuously active in phosphorylating tyrosine residues on, and thereby continuously stimulating, proteins that promote the growth, survival, and proliferation of their parent cells. In consequence, these cells take on malignant characteristics and are on the pathway of becoming cancerous. Indeed, the ETV6-NTRK3 fusion gene appears to be a critical driver of several types of cancers. It was originally identified in congenital fibrosarcoma and subsequently found in mammary secretory carcinoma (also termed juvenile breast cancer), mammary analogue secretory carcinoma of salivary glands (also termed MASC or MASC_{SG}), salivary gland–type carcinoma of the thyroid, secretory carcinoma of the skin, congenital fibrosarcoma, congenital mesoblastic nephroma, rare cases of acute myelogenous leukemia, ALK-negative Inflammatory myofibroblastic tumour, cholangiocarcinoma, and radiation-induced papillary thyroid carcinoma.

== NTRK3 inhibitors in clinical development ==
Because cancers associated with the expression of the ETV6-NTRK3 fusion protein are known or suspected of being a direct consequence of overly active ETV6-NTRK3's tyrosine kinase, it has been proposed that tyrosine kinase inhibitors with specificity for NTRK3 may be of therapeutic usefulness in these cancers. Entrectinib is a pan-NTRK as well as an ALK and ROS1 tyrosine kinase inhibitor has been found useful in treating a single patient with ETV6-NRTK3 fusion gene-associated mammary analogue secretory carcinoma and has lend support to the clinical development of NTRK3-directed tyrosine kinase inhibitors to treat ETV6-NTRK3 fusion protein associated malignancies. Three clinical trials are in the recruitment phase for determining the efficacy of treating a wide range of solid tumors associated with mutated overactive tyrosine kinase proteins, including the ETV6-TRK3 protein, with larotrectinib, a non-selective inhibitor of NTRK1, NTRK2, and NTRK3 tyrosine kinases. Larotrectinib was approved by the FDA on November 26, 2018.
