= MgB2 =

MGB2 or MgB_{2} may refer to:

- MgB_{2}, Magnesium diboride a superconductor.
- MGB2. a mammaglobin gene.
