= TEL-JAK2 =

Fusion gene

TEL-JAK2 is a gene fusion resulting from a chromosomal translocation between chromosomes 9 and 12 observed in human leukemia. The 5' moiety of TEL is fused to the 3' end of JAK2.

The oligomerisation domain of the TEL protein (also called ETV6) becomes juxtaposed to the tyrosine kinase domain of JAK2, and as result the TEL-JAK2 displays constitutive kinase activity.
