= Tissue-agnostic cancer drug =

Tissue-agnostic cancer drugs are antineoplastic drugs that treat cancers based on the mutations that they display, instead of the tissue type in which they appear. Tissue-agnostic drugs that have been approved for medical use include Pembrolizumab, Larotrectinib, Selpercatinib, Entrectinib, and Pralsetinib.

== History ==
Pembrolizumab was approved by the US Food and Drug Administration in May 2017.

Larotrectinib was approved by the FDA in November, 2018.

Selpercatinib (LOXO-292) received priority review in September 2018 and was approved for medical use in the United States in May 2020.

Entrectinib was approved for medical use in the United States in August 2019, in Australia in May 2020, and in the European Union in July 2020.

Pralsetinib was approved for medical use in the United States in September 2020.

Dabrafenib and trametinib have been approved as tissue-agnostic drugs for solid tumors that are B-RAF positive.

Tissue-agnostic cancer drugs that are under development as of May 2022 include Selitrectinib (Loxo-195) and anti-ERBB3 antibodies.
