= Bellerophon (disambiguation) =

Bellerophon is a hero in Greek mythology.

Bellerophon may also refer to:

== Arts and entertainment ==
- Bellerophon (play), an ancient Greek play by Euripides
- Bellérophon, an opera by Jean-Baptiste Lully first performed in 1679
- Bellerophon, a fictional starship in the movie Forbidden Planet
- Bellerophon, a fictional virus antidote in the film Mission: Impossible 2
- Bellerophon, a fictional planet in the episode "Trash" of Firefly
- An episode of State of Affairs (TV series)

== Locomotives ==
- Bellerophon (GWR Premier Class locomotive), built 1846
- Bellerophon (Haydock Foundry locomotive), built 1874
- Bellerophon (GWR 3031 Class locomotive), built 1894
- Bellerophon (LMS Jubilee Class locomotive) built 1936

== Ships ==
- Bellerophon-class battleship, a class of British battleships
- HMS Bellerophon, six ships of the Royal Navy

== Science and technology ==
=== Astrophysics ===
- 51 Pegasi b, the first exoplanet discovered around a main sequence star (51 Pegasi) in 1995 (50 light-years, 15 parsecs, away) and initially nicknamed Bellerophon.
- 1808 Bellerophon, an asteroid

=== Life sciences ===
- Bellerophon (mollusc), a genus of Paleozoic mollusc in the family Bellerophontidae
- Bellerophon program, a program to detect chimeric sequences
