= Infantile myofibromatosis =

Rare tumor in infants originating in connective tissue

- Other names: Myofibromas, Multicentric fibromatosis, Congenital generalized fibromatosis, and Congenital multicentric fibromatosis
- Specialty: Neonatology, Pediatrics
- Usual onset: Infancy, early childhood
- Types: Solitary tumor, Multiple tumors (no viscera involvement), and Multiple tumors (with viscera involvement)
- Causes: Familial and non-familial somatic mutations in the PDGFRB gene
- Prognosis: Guarded in multiple tumors (with visceral involvement); otherwise, good to excellent
- Frequency: rare

Infantile myofibromatosis (IMF) is a rare tumor found in 1 in 150,000 to 1 in 400,000 live births. It is nonetheless the most common tumor derived from fibrous connective tissue that occurs primarily in infants and young children. IMF tumors are benign in the sense that they do not metastasize to distant tissues although when occurring in the viscera, i.e. internal organs, carry guarded to poor prognoses and can be life-threatening, particularly in newborns and young infants. The condition was first described by Arthur Purdy Stout as congenital generalized fibromatosis – in which he coined the word fibromatosis – in 1954.

IMF tumors occur in three clinical patterns: 1) solitary IMF tumors (also called myofibromas) which often regress spontaneously and rarely cause serious issues; 2) multiple tumors (no viscera involvement) which consists of numerous (i.e. dozens to >100) IMF lesions most of which are located in the skin and subcutaneous tissues but not visceral organs, may regress spontaneously, and rarely cause serious issues; and 3) multiple tumors (with viscera involvement) (also called generalized myofibromatosis) which rarely regress spontaneously and consist of numerous IMF lesions in non-visceral tissues plus one or more visceral tumors that may be life-threatening.

A minority of infantile myofibromatosis tumors present in individuals with a strong family history of the disease. These familial cases are associated with mutations in either the PDGFRB or NOTCH3 gene. However, most IMF cases have no family history of the disease but nonetheless have PDGFRB gene mutations in their tumor cells; these mutations are similar to those occurring in the familial PDGFRB gene mutations. Regardless of these genetic variations, all IMF tumors consist of bland-appearing, benign (i.e. non-malignant) myofibroblasts, i.e. cells that blend a variable set of features seen in fibroblasts, the most common cell type in connective tissue, with a variable set of features seen in smooth muscle cells.

Treatment of IMF tumors depends upon the tumor numbers, locations, and genetic abnormalities found in each individual and often include more than one therapeutic regimen. Individuals with solitary tumors are usually treated by observation with the expectation that many of these tumors will regress spontaneiously. Single tumors located in vital areas (e.g. intracranial tumors) and tumors that do not regress over suitable observation periods are often treated by surgical removal. Multiple tumors (with viscera involvement) and surgically inaccessible life-threatening IMF tumors have been treated with one or a combination of chemotherapy drugs, radiation therapy or, in tumors with certain PDGFRB gene mutations, drugs directed specifically against this mutated gene's protein product.

== Presentation ==
IMF tumors are usually painless, well-encapsulated, rubbery to hard, and freely movable-to-fixed masses. They may be evident at birth in up to 60% of cases but generally go undetected until they are diagnosed in the first year of life, uncommonly in older infants and young (<10 years/old) children, or rarely in older children and adults (one individual was diagnosed with IMF at 85 years of age). The tumors may be flesh-colored papules or nodules; plaques (i.e. flat-topped papules that are equal to or greater than 10 mm in largest diameter); pedunculated, calcified masses; or ulcerated, necrotic masses. Most of these tumors are <1 cm in diameter but can be much larger, e.g. 5.2 cm in diameter. At least 9 IMF cases described in the English literature were diagnosed in fetuses based on the findings of fetal spectrogram and/or magnetic resonance imaging. IMF tumors in the viscera or deep tissues may present with serious or life-threatening signs and symptoms of organ and/or deep tissue damage due to these tumors space-filling and pressuring effects.

Some individuals with IMF present with a family history of IMF tumors. To date (2021), 20 families have been reported to carry various germline (i.e. inherited) mutations in one of their two PDGFRB genes. All of these mutations were gain of function mutations (i.e. the mutant gene's product is overactive) and inherited in an autosomal dominant manner with incomplete penetrance. Among 36 identified familial carriers of these mutant genes, 4 had no history of IMF, 3 had developed a solitary IMF, 29 had developed multiple tumors (no viscera involvement) or multiple tumors (with viscera involvement) IMF, and 2 had died. Most of these individuals were diagnosed with IMF in their infancy or early childhood. Subsequent studies have found that up to 70% of individuals with IMF and no family history of the disease also carry mutations in one of their two PDGFRB genes in the cells of their tumor tissues. These mutations are somatic mutations (i.e. non-inherited mutations developing only after conception) that are identical or similar to those seen in familial cases. The familial and non-familial mutated PDGFRB genes produce highly overactive platelet-derived growth factor receptor beta (i.e. PDGFβ receptor) proteins that contribute to the development and/or progression of IMF.

A mutation in one of the two NOTCH3 genes has been reported to occur in a single family with autosomal dominant inheritance of IMF: 9 of this family's members had IMF plus the mutation while 7 of its members did not have IMF or the mutation. Since the mutated NOTCH3 gene in this family produces an overactive neurogenic locus notch homolog protein 3 product that in cell culture studies increases the expression of the PDGFRB gene's product, the PDGFβ receptor, this NOTCH3 mutation may promote the development and/or progression of IMF in a manner similar to PDGFRB mutant genes, i.e. by increasing the number and therefore overall activity of the PDGFβ receptor. Further studies are needed to define NOTCH3 gene mutation's frequency of occurrence in, and contribution to the development of, IMF.

=== Solitary IMF tumors ===
Solitary IMF tumors represent 50 to 74% of all IMF cases. These tumors commonly present with a mass that infiltrates the surrounding tissue in the head and neck areas (e.g. in the ethmoid sinus/maxillary sinus, infratemporal fossa, tongue, hard palate, behind an ear, or temporal bone); less commonly in other sites such as the scapula/axilla area, lower back, or soft tissue/bone in the lower leg; and also less commonly in visceral organs such as the pancreas, spleen, lung, or heart. Solitary IMF tumors often (i.e. 25 to 61% of cases in different studies) regress spontaneously.

=== Multiple tumors (no viscera involvement) ===
Multiple tumors (no viscera involvement) typically occur as dozens to hundreds of mostly small tumors located in various areas such as the skin, muscles, and frontal eye socket, These tumors do not involve visceral organs, often take a benign course, and may regress spontaneously.

=== Multiple tumors (with viscera involvement) ===
Multiple tumors (with viscera involvement) typically occur as dozens to hundreds of tumors located in the same sites as multiple tumors (no viscera involvement) but also occur in one or more visceral organs such as those in the gastrointestinal tract and upper respiratory tract and/or the heart, liver, cerebellum, rectum, parietal cortex of brain, and lung. This form of IMF, particularly in cases with tumors involving the gastrointestinal tract, heart, and/or lung, has a far higher morbidity and mortality than the other forms with death occurring in infants during the first weeks to 4 months of life in 30–70% of cases Death is typically due to a tumor's compression of vital organs or tissues (e.g. blood vessels). However, there are uncommon cases of multiple tumors (with viscera involvement) that were not associated with serious symptoms, were observed without treatment, and over time showed spontaneous regressions of all or almost all of their tumors.

== Pathology ==
Microscopic histopathologic analyses of IMF tumor tissues commonly show repeated patterns of a central zone consisting of spindle-shaped cells lining capillaries and round-to-oval cells arranged around prominent "antler-shaped" vascular spaces all of which are surrounded by a peripheral zone of clustered smooth muscle-like cells. The relative proportions of the two zones can vary within different areas of a tumor and between tumors. Immunohistochemical analyses indicate that the spindle-shaped cells strongly express smooth muscle actin, calponin, and, less commonly, desmin proteins.

== Gene abnormalities ==
=== Familial IMF ===
Twenty families with inherited IMF have been shown to have mutations in one of their two PDGFRB genes. The PDGFRB gene is located in band 32 on the long (or "q") arm of chromosome 5. Of the 20 families with PDGFRB gene mutations, 15 carried a p.Arg561Cys mutation. This mutation substitutes the amino acid Arg, i.e. arginine, for the amino acid cystine at the 561st amino acid position as numbered starting at the N-terminus of the genes product protein, the PDGFβ receptor. Four of the remaining families carried either a p.Pro560Leu (Pro=proline, Leu=leucine); p.Arg561Ser (Ser=serine); p. Lys567Glu (Lys=lysine, Glu=glutamate); or p.Pro660Thr (Thr=threonine) mutation in this protein. The NOTCH3 gene (located in band 13.12 on the short (or "p") arm of chromosome 19) mutation in the carrier family was p. Leu1519Pro. The p.Arg561Cys, p.Pro560Leu, p.Arg561Ser, and p. Lys567Glu mutations are regarded as contributing to the development and/or progression of IMF while the p.Pro660Thr PDGFRB gene mutation and the p. Leu1519Pro NOTCH3 p. Leu1519Pro gene mutation require further study to determine more clearly their clinical significances.

=== Non-familial IMF ===
Somatic PDGFRB gene mutations have been found in 29% of individuals with solitary IMF tumors and 68% of individuals with multiple tumors (with viscera involvement) plus multiple tumors (no visceral involvement) IMF. In about 50% of these cases, these somatic mutations were the same as those found in familial IMF with the remaining cases having mutations in other sites of the gene. These other somatic mutation sites included 2 cases of p.Asp850Val (Asp=aspartate, Val=valine), 2 case of p.Asn666Lys (Asn=asparagine, Lys=lysine), and concurrent double mutations p.Arg561Cyt plus Asp666Lys in one case and p.Trp566Arg (Trp=tryptophan) plus AspN666Lys in another case. Three cases had more complex mutations involving multiple gene sites with two of them having the p.Asn666Lys mutation gene in combination with other mutations.

=== PDGFRB gene ===
The PDGFRB gene product, the PDGFβ receptor, is normally highly expressed in fibroblasts and other cells of mesenchymal origin including vascular smooth muscle cells. When activated, the PDGFβ receptor's tyrosine kinase stimulates cell signaling proteins such as phosphatidylinositol-3 kinase, STAT proteins, phospholipase Cγ, and GRB2 which in turn promote their parent cells to grow, proliferate, and survive for abnormally prolonged times. The PDGFβ receptor gene is a proto-oncogene, i.e. a normal gene that when mutated could form a cancer-causing oncoprotein. Studies show that the PDGFRB mutant proteins in IMF are constitutively overactive and that the tyrosine kinase inhibitor imatinib blocks the activity of the p.Arg561Cys and p.Asn666Lys mutants as well as the p.Arg561Cyt plus Asp666Lys and p.Trp566Arg plus AspN666Lys double mutants but not the p.Asp850Val mutant. Two other tyrosine kinase inhibitors, dasatinib and ponatinib, do inhibit the p.Asp850Val mutant's tyrosine kinase activity. Limited initial studies suggest that these inhibitors are useful in treating severe cases of IMF.

== Diagnosis ==
Based on their clinical presentation and gross appearance IMF tumors can be confused with a wide range of benign and malignant papular, nodular, and tumorous lesions particular in cases which involve multiple tumors. However, the presence of two zone histopathology, family history of disease, and presence of the above cited PDGFRB gene mutations are almost always definitive indicators of IMF. IMF and the classic form of mesoblastic nephroma have been suggested to be the same disease because of their very similar histopathology. However, mesoblastic nephroma tumor cells, unlike IMF tumor cells, express cyclin D1 and Beta-catenin proteins and therefore likely have a very different cellular origin than IMF tumors. Infantile digital fibromatosis, a tumor that develops primarily in the fingers and toes, had been regarded as a type of IMF. However its tumors have a distinctly different clinical presentation and histopathology than IMF. The World Health Organization (2020) redefined infantile digital fibromatosis as a benign tumor in the category of benign fibroblastic and myofibroblastic tumors and therefore different than IMF.

== Treatment and prognosis ==
There are no controlled studies to define the optimal treatment(s) for IMF. The following give the currently widely used and recommended treatments along with the result of these treatments for the three categories of the IMF tumors.

=== Solitary IMF tumors ===
Solitary IMF tumors typically grow slowly, produce few or no symptoms, and often regress spontaneously within 18 to 24 months of diagnosis. A watchful waiting strategy is commonly used for these tumors. Visceral solitary IMF tumors that cause significant tissue injury, are located in vital areas, and/or are life-threatening have been treated by surgical excision or, if surgery is deemed inappropriate, are treated with drugs and/or radiation therapy as indicated in the following section on multiple tumors (with visceral involvement). Surgical excision has also been used if the diagnosis of the tumor is in doubt. In rare cases, aggressive IMF tumors have recurred after regressing and required further observation and/or treatment. Overall, the prognosis in almost all cases of solitary IMF is good to excellent.

=== Multiple tumors (no viscera involvement) ===
Multiple tumors (no viscera involvement) also may regress spontaneously and carry a good to excellent prognosis even when they invade local tissues. However, neonates presenting with multiple IMF tumors should undergo a through examination including medical imaging tests to determine the extent of their disease, particularly with respect to determining if a visceral tumor(s) is present and therefore that the proper diagnosis is multiple tumors (with viscera involvement). The treatment of multiple tumors (no viscera involvement) is similar to that used for solitary IMF tumors.

=== Multiple tumors (with viscera involvement) ===
Individuals with multiple tumors (with viscera involvement) have numerous tumors one or more of which are located in and often injure a vital internal organ and may be life-threatening. Cases in which one of the tumors is in a vital organ and seriously symptomatic have been successfully treated with surgical resection. Cases where surgical resection of a single symptomatic tumor is not a good option and cases with multiple visceral tumors are treated by non-surgical methods. These tumors typically respond to conventional systemic chemotherapy with reductions in their sizes; these responses are usually observed only after several weeks of therapy. Chemotherapy regimes that have successfully treated these cases include low dosage: vincristine plus dactinomycin; vinblastine plus methotrexate; vinblastine plus the glucocorticoid, prednisolone; vincristine plus actinomycin D plus the glucocorticoid, prednisone; and vincristine plus dactinomycin plus cyclophosphamide. A cytokine, interferon alpha, has also been used as a single-drug treatment in at least one of these cases. Multiple tumors (with viscera involvement) have also been treated with surgical resection in combination with these drugs and/or with radiation therapy alone or combined with these drugs.

Recently, tyrosine kinase inhibitors have been used to treat PDGFRB-associated IMF cases. Imatinib or imatinib plus a second tyrosine kinase inhibitor, sorafenib, have successful treated several cases and chemotherapy plus imatinib have successfully treated a few cases of life-threatening IMF. Studies suggest that: 1) the tyrosine kinase inhibitor should be selected based on the PDGFRB oncoprotein's sensitivity to it (e.g. dasatinib or ponatinib should be used to treat patients with the imatinib-resistant p.Asp850Val PDGFRB gene mutation.); 2) imatinib should be the initial choice and dasatinib or ponatinib be used for cases failing to respond to imatinib in cases where the PDGFRB gene mutation has not been defined; and 3) the inhibitors precise dosages for use in newborns and infants are not well-defined, have serious side-affects, and therefore should only be considered for refractory, life-threatening IMF tumors.

== See also ==
- Skin lesion
- List of cutaneous conditions
- mesoblastic nephroma
