= Bellerophon program =

Bellerophon is a computer program for detecting chimeric sequences in multiple sequence datasets by an adaptation of partial treeing analysis. Bellerophon was specifically developed to detect 16S rRNA gene chimeras in PCR-clone libraries of environmental samples, but can be applied to other nucleotide sequence alignments.
