= Papillomatosis of breasts =

Papillomatosis of the breast
- Other names: Juvenile papillomatosis, Swiss cheese disease
- Specialty: Breast surgery, Surgical oncology
- Usual onset: Children, adolescents, adult men and women
- Treatment: Surgical removal
- Prognosis: guarded
- Frequency: rare
- Deaths: rare

Papillomatosis of the breast (PB) is a rare, benign, epitheliosis-like lesion, i.e. an overgrowth of the cells lining the ducts of glands that resembles a papilla (i.e. small rounded protuberance) or nipple-like nodule/tumor. PB tumors develop in the apocrine glands of the breast. PB is also termed juvenile papillomatosis because of its frequent occurrence in younger women (including, in uncommon cases, children and adolescent females) and Swiss cheese disease because of its microscopic appearance. Rarely, PB has also been diagnosed in very young, adolescent, and adult males.

A PB tumor is typically an asymptomatic lesion that is detected on examination as a palpable but otherwise symptomless breast mass or in some cases by routine breast cancer screening methods in individuals unaware of the mass's presence. Although PB tumors are themselves benign, a significant percentage of individuals with these tumors concurrently have or will develop certain types of breast carcinomas and/or have a family history of relatives with breast carcinomas. Cases of PB have also been reported to occur in individuals with a family history of certain genetic diseases.

Pediatric cases of PB tumors are commonly treated by total resection. Complete excision of PB tumors with clear surgical margins to remove all tumor cells is important in order to reduce a recurrence of the tumor at its site of removal. Regular, long-term follow-up monitoring is recommended especially for individuals with multiple PB tumors, individuals who have a family history of relatives with breast cancer, and/or individuals with PB tumors that have other aggressive features.

== Presentation ==
The majority of BP cases have been diagnosed in Caucasians with only rare cases being diagnosed in individuals of Asian, or African descent. At least 6 cases of BP have been reported to occur in women during their pregnancies. BP tumors commonly present as multinodular, mobile, well-circumscribed masses 3 to 8 centimeters in widest diameter located in the periphery of a breast. Rarely, these tumors have been less than 3 centimeters in widest diameter or larger than 8 centimeters in widest diameter; in one case, the PB tumor, termed giant juvenile papillomatosis, was 20 centimeters in widest diameter. While usually a single tumor, BP tumors have presented as two or more tumors in one breast or bilateral disease, i.e. tumors in both breasts. In a review of 354 reported cases of PB: 344 occurred in females (~96%), 6 in males (~2%), and 2 (~0.6) in individuals whose sex was not mentioned; the individuals ranged from 7 months to 81 years (average age 26 years); 316 (~90%) individuals complained of a palpable mass, 2 (~0.6%) of pain, 2 (~0.6%) of nipple discharge (this discharge may be bloody), and 1 (0.3%) of a palpable mass plus nipple discharge; 18 (~5%) had an entirely symptomless breast tumor detected by breast cancer screening methods; 25 (~7%) individuals had an associated breast carcinoma at diagnoses and 68 (19%) had a family history of breast cancer. The breast cancers associated with BP are mammary secretory carcinomas, lobular carcinoma in situ, invasive lobular carcinoma, ductal carcinoma in situ, and invasive ductal carcinoma. A positive family history of breast cancer together with recurrent bilateral PG is a risk factor for developing these breast cancers. The genetic diseases associated with BP are Cowden disease, Noonan syndrome, Proteus syndrome, and neurofibromatosis type 1.

== Pathology ==
At their surgical excision, PB lesions grossly appear as tumors with visible cysts of different sizes intermingled with fibrotic areas. Some of these cysts are filled with liquid. The microscopic histopathological findings in PB tumor tissues stained with H&E include the excessive proliferation of irregularly shaped, variably sized, ductal epithelial cells, ductal myoepithelial cells, and lipid-laden, foamy intra-cystic histiocytes within the breast's apocrine glands, abnormally widened gland ducts, abundant large extracellular and intracellular cysts (many of which are filled with mucus) that give the lesions their Swiss cheese-like appearance, and sclerosing adenosis (i.e. enlarged breast lobules distorted by scar-like tissue). The lesions may contain areas of microcalcification and/or necrosis, i.e. dead cells. Immunohistochemical analyses of these tumors may detect cells that express estrogen, progesterone, epidermal growth factor and/or HER2/neu receptors.

=== Gene abnormalities ===
In a study of 10 individuals with PB, 5 had tumor cells with mutations in the PIK3CA gene and 2 had tumor cells with mutations in the AKT1 gene. The mutations occurred in these genes' hot spots, i.e. areas of a genes' DNA that are likely to mutate. Two of the 3 individuals with family histories of breast cancer had PIK3C gene mutation and one individual with a family history of breast cancer had an AKT1 gene mutation. A subsequent study found PIK3CA gene mutations in 3 of 3 individuals with PB. One of these individuals had PB coexisting with ductal carcinoma in situ and invasive ductal carcinoma; the same PIC3K mutation was detected in all three lesions. The PIK3CA and AKT1 genes are key components of the PI3K/AKT/mTOR pathway of cell signaling. This pathway promotes cell growth, proliferation, survival, and the development and/or progression of various cancers including breast carcinomas. It is interesting to note that individuals with two genetic diseases associated with the development of PB have gene mutations involving this pathway, i.e. the Proteus syndrome caused by an activating mutations in the AKT1 gene and the Cowden syndrome caused by a mutation in the PTEN (gene) tumor suppressor gene. Finally, individual cases of PB have been found to have mutations in the MET, FGFR3, PTEN, ATM, GNAS and/or a gene, NF1, which causes another genetic disease associated with PB, neurofibromatosis type 1. Further studies are needed to determine the role these mutations may play in the development of PB and/or their potential usefulness in predicting the development of breast carcinomas in individuals with PB.

== Diagnosis ==
PB tumors are diagnosed based on their microscopic histopathology, including in particular the presence of cysts that give these tumors their Swiss cheese appearance. PB tumors have clinical manifestations which are very similar to, and prior to tissue analysis have been diagnoses as, fibroadenomas. However, the two breast tumor types have very different microscopic features. Studies have found that ultrasonography, including Doppler ultrasonography, help in diagnosing PB, particularly in pregnant women where other imaging methods such as mammography and magnetic resonance imaging expose the mother and her fetus to radiation. Ultrasonography imaging typically reveals a poorly defined heterogeneous mass with various small, round, echo-free areas mostly located near the lesions' borders and thereby helps in distinguishing PB tumors from similar cystic lesions such as fibroadenomas, phyllodes tumors, papillomas growing within a cyst, and breast cancer. The diagnosis of PB may be suggested in individuals with the clinical presentation of PB plus the presence of a family history of mammary secretory carcinomas, lobular carcinoma, ductal carcinoma in situ, invasive ductal carcinomas of no special type, Cowden disease, Noonan syndrome, Proteus syndrome, or neurofibromatosis type 1.

== Treatment ==
The preferred treatment for PB tumors is complete surgical excision with histologic confirmation that all tumor tissue has been removed: incomplete excision of this tumor's tissues commonly leads to recurrence of the tumor at the site of its surgical removal. PB tumors diagnosed in pregnant females during their late third trimester, it is suggested, may have their surgical excision of the tumor postponed until after delivery. Annual clinical follow-ups, including physical examination and/or ultrasonography of the breasts is recommended for individuals with PB and their female relatives, particularly for individuals with a family history of breast cancer, recurrent PB tumors, and/or bilateral PB tumors. Because excision can cause permanent deformity or dysfunction of the breast tissue, some studies recommend that surgical intervention in children should be reserved for symptomatic tumors or tumors that are associated with a compromised prognosis and that any resections done in children should aim to preserve as much normal breast tissue as possible.

== Prognosis ==
While removal of all PB tumor tissues generally indicates that no further treatment is indicated, the possibility that the carcinomas associated with this disease may occur soon or long after the original PB tumor is removed and may be less effectively treated than PB tumors make the prognosis of PB somewhat guarded.
