= Merestinib =

Experimental cancer drug

Clinical data
- Routes of administration: PO
- ATC code: none

Identifiers
- IUPAC name: N-(3-Fluoro-4-{[1-methyl-6-(1H-pyrazol-4-yl)-1H-indazol-5-yl]oxy}phenyl)-1-(4-fluorophenyl)-6-methyl-2-oxo-1,2-dihydropyridine-3-carboxamide
- CAS Number: 1206799-15-6
- ChemSpider: 29361338
- UNII: 5OGS5K699E
- KEGG: D11763
- CompTox Dashboard (EPA): DTXSID20659635
- ECHA InfoCard: 100.233.673

Chemical and physical data
- Formula: C_{30}H_{22}F_{2}N_{6}O_{3}
- Molar mass: 552.542 g·mol^{−1}
- 3D model (JSmol): Interactive image
- SMILES: Cc1ccc(c(=O)n1c2ccc(cc2)F)C(=O)Nc3ccc(c(c3)F)Oc4cc5cnn(c5cc4c6c[nH]nc6)C
- InChI: InChI=1S/C30H22F2N6O3/c1-17-3-9-23(30(40)38(17)22-7-4-20(31)5-8-22)29(39)36-21-6-10-27(25(32)12-21)41-28-11-18-16-35-37(2)26(18)13-24(28)19-14-33-34-15-19/h3-16H,1-2H3,(H,33,34)(H,36,39); Key:QHADVLVFMKEIIP-UHFFFAOYSA-N

Merestinib (LY2801653) is an experimental cancer drug in development by Eli Lilly. It is a small molecule inhibitor of MET and several other receptor tyrosine kinases such as MST1R, FLT3, AXL, MERTK, TEK, ROS1, NTRK1/2/3, and DDR1/2.

Meristinib is part of a phase II clinical trial for advanced billiary tract cancer. The study is expected to be complete in April 2018. Phase II clinical trials for non-small cell lung cancer and solid tumors began in November 2016.
