= FCHO2 =

Protein-coding gene in the species Homo sapiens

Identifiers
- Aliases: FCHO2, FCH domain only 2, FCH and mu domain containing endocytic adaptor 2
- External IDs: OMIM: 613438; MGI: 3505790; GeneCards: FCHO2
Available structures
PDB	Ortholog search: PDBe RCSB
PDB	List of PDB id codes 2V0O

Gene location (Human)
Chr.	Chromosome 5 (human)
Band	5q13.2	Start	72,956,041 bp
Band	5q13.2	End	73,090,522 bp

Gene location (Mouse)
Chr.	Chromosome 13 (mouse)
Band	13|13 D1	Start	98,859,911 bp
Band	13|13 D1	End	98,951,957 bp
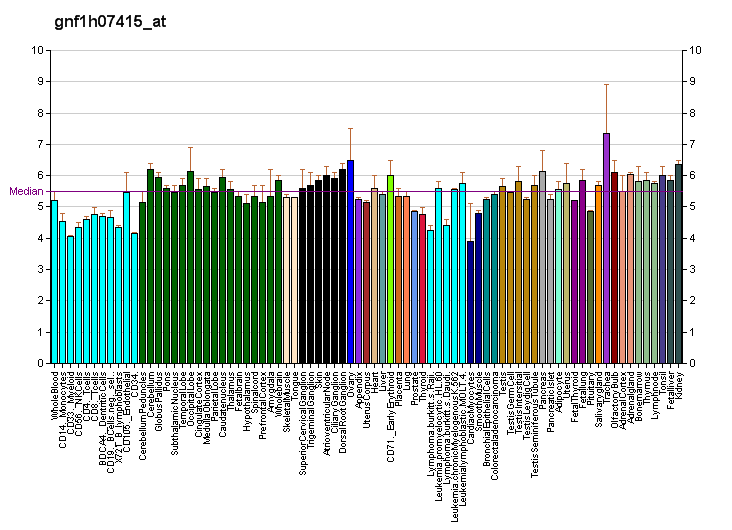
RNA expression pattern
Bgee	Human / Mouse (ortholog); Top expressed in: mucosa of ileum; Achilles tendon; tibialis anterior muscle; skin of hip; jejunal mucosa; skin of thigh; lower lobe of lung; oral cavity; mucosa of pharynx; visceral pleura / Top expressed in: interventricular septum; granulocyte; superior cervical ganglion; epithelium of small intestine; zygote; tail of embryo; hand; carotid body; suprachiasmatic nucleus; otolith organ; More reference expression data
BioGPS	More reference expression data
Gene ontology
Molecular function	phosphatidylinositol-4,5-bisphosphate binding; phosphatidylserine binding; protein binding; phosphatidylinositol binding; identical protein binding; phospholipid binding; microtubule binding; cytoskeletal protein binding; tubulin binding
Cellular component	plasma membrane; clathrin-coated pit; membrane; clathrin-coated vesicle; cytosol; presynaptic endocytic zone membrane; cytoplasm; cytoskeleton; AP-2 adaptor complex
Biological process	membrane invagination; protein localization to plasma membrane; endocytosis; clathrin coat assembly; synaptic vesicle endocytosis; membrane organization; clathrin-dependent endocytosis; plasma membrane tubulation
Sources:Amigo / QuickGO
Orthologs
Databases	NCBI: entry; OMA: entry
Species	Human	Mouse
Entrez	115548	218503
Ensembl	ENSG00000157107	ENSMUSG00000041685
UniProt	Q0JRZ9	Q3UQN2
RefSeq (mRNA)	NM_138782; NM_001146032	NM_172591
RefSeq (protein)	NP_001139504; NP_620137	NP_766179
Location (UCSC)	Chr 5: 72.96 – 73.09 Mb	Chr 13: 98.86 – 98.95 Mb
PubMed search
- Wikidata
View/Edit Human	View/Edit Mouse

FCH domain only protein 2 is a protein that in humans is encoded by the FCHO2 gene.
