= GCFC2 =

Protein-coding gene in the species Homo sapiens

Identifiers
- Aliases: GCFC2, C2orf3, DNABF, GCF, TCF9, GC-rich sequence DNA-binding factor 2
- External IDs: OMIM: 189901; MGI: 2141656; HomoloGene: 2411; GeneCards: GCFC2; OMA:GCFC2 - orthologs

Gene location (Human)
| Chr. | Chromosome 2 (human) |
| Band | 2p12 | Start | 75,652,000 bp |
| Band | 2p12 | End | 75,710,985 bp |

Gene location (Mouse)
| Chr. | Chromosome 6 (mouse) |
| Band | 6|6 C3 | Start | 81,923,669 bp |
| Band | 6|6 C3 | End | 81,959,915 bp |
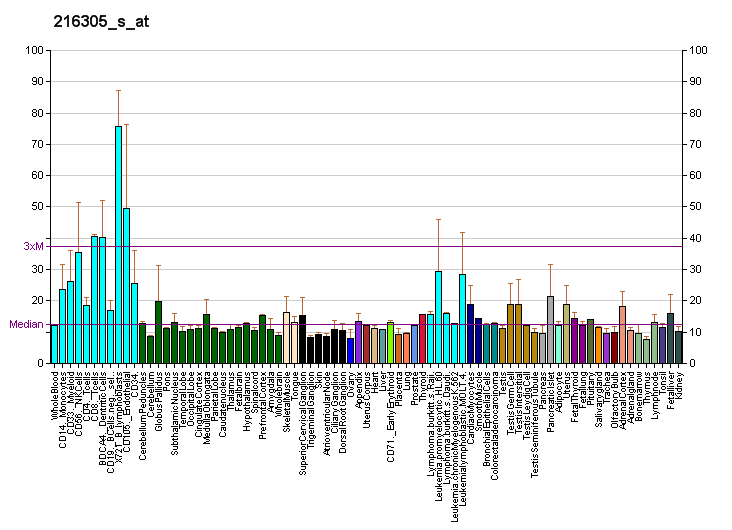
RNA expression pattern
| Bgee | Human / Mouse (ortholog); Top expressed in: ventricular zone; gastrocnemius muscle; right lobe of liver; Achilles tendon; muscle of thigh; canal of the cervix; right uterine tube; body of pancreas; gonad; ectocervix / Top expressed in: hand; superior cervical ganglion; tail of embryo; otolith organ; utricle; foot; epiblast; genital tubercle; Rostral migratory stream; ventricular zone; More reference expression data |
| BioGPS | More reference expression data |
Gene ontology
| Molecular function | DNA-binding transcription factor activity; RNA polymerase II cis-regulatory region sequence-specific DNA binding; DNA binding; DNA-binding transcription repressor activity, RNA polymerase II-specific; protein binding |
| Cellular component | nucleolus; nucleus; U2-type post-mRNA release spliceosomal complex; nucleoplasm; cytosol |
| Biological process | mRNA processing; spliceosomal complex assembly; negative regulation of transcription, DNA-templated; regulation of transcription, DNA-templated; negative regulation of transcription by RNA polymerase II; transcription, DNA-templated; RNA splicing; mRNA splicing, via spliceosome |
Sources:Amigo / QuickGO
Orthologs
| Species | Human | Mouse |
| Entrez | 6936 | 330361 |
| Ensembl | ENSG00000005436 | ENSMUSG00000035125 |
| UniProt | P16383 | Q8BKT3 |
| RefSeq (mRNA) | NM_001201334; NM_001201335; NM_003203 | NM_177884 |
| RefSeq (protein) | NP_001188263; NP_001188264; NP_003194 | NP_808552 |
| Location (UCSC) | Chr 2: 75.65 – 75.71 Mb | Chr 6: 81.92 – 81.96 Mb |
| PubMed search |
- Wikidata
| View/Edit Human | View/Edit Mouse |

GC-rich sequence DNA-binding factor is a protein that in humans is encoded by the GCFC2 gene.

The first mRNA transcript isolated for this gene was part of an artificial chimera derived from two distinct gene transcripts and a primer used in the cloning process (see Genbank accession M29204). A positively charged amino terminus present only in the chimera was determined to bind GC-rich DNA, thus mistakenly thought to identify a transcription factor gene.
