= Fusion transcript =

Chimeric RNA

Fusion transcript is a chimeric RNA encoded by a fusion gene or by two different genes by subsequent trans-splicing. Certain fusion transcripts are commonly produced by cancer cells, and detection of fusion transcripts is part of routine diagnostics of certain cancer types.
