= Secretory carcinoma =

Genetic abnormality

Secretory carcinoma was once used exclusively as a term for rare, slowly growing breast tumors without reference to their location in the breast. It is now termed mammary secretory carcinoma because secretory carcinoma has sometimes been used to name tumors which develop in non-breast tissues but have the microscopic appearance of, and a critical gene abnormality found in, mammary secretory carcinoma. This genetic abnormality is a balanced genetic translocation that forms a ETV6-NTRK3 fusion gene which appears involved in promoting the development and/or progression of all these tumors. The formerly termed secretory carcinomas include:

== Mammary secretory carcinoma ==
Mammary secretory carcinoma, also termed secretory carcinoma of the breast, is a slow growing breast cancer that develops in female adults and, in a significant percentage of cases, males and children. While rare, it is the most common type of breast cancer that develops in children. (Mammary secretory carcinoma, termed secretory carcinoma at the time, was first described in 1966.)

== Mammary analogue secretory carcinoma ==
Mammary analogue secretory carcinoma, also termed MASC_{SG}, is a slow growing salivary gland neoplasm (the SG in MASC_{SG} stands for salivary gland) that develops in adults and, in a significant number of cases, children. MASC_{SG} tumors are located most often in a parotid salivary gland or infrequently a buccal mucosa salivary gland, submandibular salivary gland, or small salivary gland in the lower lip, upper lip, or hard palate. (MASC_{SG} was first described in 2010.)

== Secretory carcinoma of the skin ==
As of 2021, 26 cases of secretory carcinoma of the skin had been reported. In a review of 25 cases, the skin tumors occurred in 16 females and 9 males aged 13 to 98 years (mean: 51.8 years). These tumors most common locations were the axilla (10 cases), neck (3), and lip (3 cases) with single cases occurring in other skin sites such as a cheek, eyelid, thigh, or skin at the base of a breast nipple. The tumors were treated primarily by surgical removal plus in some cases nearby lymph node radiotherapy. Although these patients need to be followed for longer periods, at the times of their last follow-up reports, all of these patients' tumors had taken indolent courses without recurring or metastasizing to distant tissues. However, in a recent report not included in the series of 25 cases, a 31-year-old female was diagnosed with an axillary secretory carcinoma of the skin and treated with surgical removal of the tumor and radiotherapy to nearby lymph nodes; 4 years later, the patient developed metastasizes in both lungs. Most of these tumors consisted of cells that expressed the NTRK3-ETV6 fusion gene. (Secretory carcinoma in the skin was first described in 2009.)

== Salivary gland–type carcinoma of the thyroid ==
Salivary gland–type carcinoma of the thyroid, also termed intrathyroidal mammary analog secretory carcinoma, has been reported in 12 cases in the English language. In a review of 11 cases, salivary gland–type carcinomas of the thyroid were diagnosed in adult females (9 cases) and males (2 cases) with an average age 61.5 years (range: 36–74 years). These individuals presented with a thyroid mass with two individuals complaining of shortness of breath and one individual complaining of hoarseness. Their tumors' microscopic histopathology resembled that described in the pathology section of mammary secretory carcinoma and consisted of tumor cells that expressed the NTRK3-ETV6 fusion gene. All cases were treated by thyroidectomy (removal of the thyroid gland) plus radiotherapy in 6 cases and/or chemotherapy in 3 cases. Six of 10 individuals experienced local recurrences (n = 3) or one or more metastases (n = 3) after initial treatment; their tumors had invaded nearby normal thyroid tissues, trachea, mediastinum, and/or and cartilage and metastasized to the liver, lung, kidney, bone, and/or soft tissues. Salivary gland-type carcinoma of the thyroid appears to be a more aggressive disease than mammary secretory carcinoma or MASC_{SG}. (Salivary gland-type carcinoma of the thyroid was first described in 2015.)

== Secretory carcinomas located in other sites ==
Tumors with the microscopic histopathology of secretory carcinomas and consisting of cells that express the NTRK3-ETV6 fusion gene have been reported to occur in the nasal cavity of a 51 year old (tumor size: 1.5×1.5×0.4 cm) and 62 (tumor size: 4×4×1.5) year old woman, an ethmoid sinus of a 67-year-old female, lung of a 62-year-old female (8.5 cm in largest dimension), and vulva of a 51-year-old female.
