= Tropomyosin kinase =

Class of enzymes

tropomyosin kinase

Identifiers
- EC no.: 2.7.11.28
- CAS no.: 90804-56-1

Databases
- IntEnz: IntEnz view
- BRENDA: BRENDA entry
- ExPASy: NiceZyme view
- KEGG: KEGG entry
- MetaCyc: metabolic pathway
- PRIAM: profile
- PDB structures: RCSB PDB PDBe PDBsum
- Gene Ontology: AmiGO / QuickGO
Search
- PMC: articles
- PubMed: articles
- NCBI: proteins

In enzymology, a tropomyosin kinase (EC 2.7.11.28) is an enzyme that catalyzes the chemical reaction

ATP + tropomyosin $\rightleftharpoons$ ADP + O-phosphotropomyosin

Thus, the two substrates of this enzyme are ATP and tropomyosin, whereas its two products are ADP and O-phosphotropomyosin.

This enzyme belongs to the family of transferases, specifically those transferring a phosphate group to the sidechain oxygen atom of serine or threonine residues in proteins (protein-serine/threonine kinases). The systematic name of this enzyme class is ATP:tropomyosin O-phosphotransferase. Other names in common use include tropomyosin kinase (phosphorylating), and STK.
