= JAZF1 =

Protein-coding gene in the species Homo sapiens

Identifiers
- Aliases: JAZF1, TIP27, ZNF802, JAZF zinc finger 1
- External IDs: OMIM: 606246; MGI: 2141450; GeneCards: JAZF1

Gene location (Human)
Chr.	Chromosome 7 (human)
Band	7p15.2-p15.1	Start	27,830,573 bp
Band	7p15.2-p15.1	End	28,180,795 bp

Gene location (Mouse)
Chr.	Chromosome 6 (mouse)
Band	6 B3|6 25.74 cM	Start	52,745,782 bp
Band	6 B3|6 25.74 cM	End	53,045,616 bp
RNA expression pattern
Bgee	Human / Mouse (ortholog); Top expressed in: trabecular bone; tail of epididymis; right adrenal cortex; left adrenal cortex; urethra; endometrium; oocyte; decidua; secondary oocyte; smooth muscle tissue / Top expressed in: zygote; secondary oocyte; epithelium of lens; primary oocyte; interventricular septum; Region I of hippocampus proper; dentate gyrus of hippocampal formation granule cell; spermatocyte; uterus; arcuate nucleus; More reference expression data
BioGPS	n/a
Gene ontology
Molecular function	nucleic acid binding; metal ion binding; transcription corepressor activity; DNA-binding transcription factor activity, RNA polymerase II-specific; protein binding
Cellular component	transcription repressor complex; fibrillar center; nucleus; cytosol
Biological process	lipid metabolism; transcription, DNA-templated; negative regulation of transcription by RNA polymerase II; regulation of transcription, DNA-templated
Sources:Amigo / QuickGO
Orthologs
Databases	NCBI: entry; OMA: entry
Species	Human	Mouse
Entrez	221895	231986
Ensembl	ENSG00000153814	ENSMUSG00000063568
UniProt	Q86VZ6	Q80ZQ5
RefSeq (mRNA)	NM_175061	NM_001168277; NM_173406
RefSeq (protein)	NP_778231	NP_001161749; NP_775582
Location (UCSC)	Chr 7: 27.83 – 28.18 Mb	Chr 6: 52.75 – 53.05 Mb
PubMed search
- Wikidata
View/Edit Human	View/Edit Mouse

Juxtaposed with another zinc finger protein 1 (JAZF1) also known as TAK1-interacting protein 27 (TIP27) or zinc finger protein 802 (ZNF802) is a protein that in humans is encoded by the JAZF1 gene. Variants are associated with an increased risk of prostate cancer, an increased risk of type 2 diabetes, and an increased height.

== Function ==
This gene encodes a nuclear protein with three C_{2}H_{2}-type zinc fingers, and functions as a transcriptional repressor. Chromosomal aberrations involving this gene are associated with endometrial stromal tumors. Alternatively spliced variants which encode different protein isoforms have been described; however, not all variants have been fully characterized
