= Trans-splicing =

Maturation process joining exons from different pre-mRNAs into a mature mRNA

Trans-splicing is a special form of RNA processing where exons from two different primary RNA transcripts are joined end to end and ligated. It is usually found in eukaryotes and mediated by the spliceosome, although some bacteria and archaea also have "half-genes" for tRNAs.

== Genic trans-splicing ==
Whereas "normal" (cis-)splicing processes a single molecule, trans-splicing generates a single RNA transcript from multiple separate pre-mRNAs. This phenomenon can be exploited for molecular therapy to address mutated gene products. Genic trans-splicing allows variability in RNA diversity and increases proteome complexity.

=== Oncogenesis ===
While some fusion transcripts occur via trans-splicing in normal human cells, trans-splicing can also be the mechanism behind certain oncogenic fusion transcripts.

== SL trans-splicing ==
Spliced leader (SL) trans-splicing is used by certain microorganisms, notably protists of the Kinetoplastea class to express genes. In these organisms, a capped splice leader RNA is transcribed, and simultaneously, genes are transcribed in long polycistrons. The capped splice leader is trans-spliced onto each gene to generate monocistronic capped and polyadenylated transcripts. These early-diverging eukaryotes use few introns, and the spliceosome they possess show some unusual variations in their structure assembly. They also possess multiple eIF4E isoforms with specialized roles in capping. The spliced leader sequence is highly conserved in lower species that undergo trans-splicing. Such as trypanosomes. While the spliced leader's role is not known in the cell, it's thought to be involved in translation initiation. In C.elegans, the splicing of the sequence leader occurs close to the initiation codon. Some scientists also suggest the sequence is required for cell viability. In Ascaris, the spliced leader sequence is needed to the RNA gene can be transcribed. The Spliced leader sequence may be responsible for initiation, mRNA localization, and translation initiation or inhibition.

Some other eukaryotes, notably among dinoflagellates, sponges, nematodes, cnidarians, ctenophores, flatworms, crustaceans, chaetognaths, rotifers, and tunicates also use more or less frequently the SL trans-splicing. In the tunicate Ciona intestinalis, the extent of SL trans-splicing is better described by a quantitative view recognising frequently and infrequently trans-spliced genes rather than a binary and conventional categorisation of trans-spliced versus non-trans-spliced genes.

The SL trans-splicing functions in the resolution of polycistronic transcripts of operons into individual 5'-capped mRNAs. This processing is achieved when the outrons are trans-spliced to unpaired, downstream acceptor sites adjacent to cistron open reading frames.

== Mechanism ==
Trans-splicing is characterized by the joining of two separate exons transcribed RNAs. The signal for this splicing is the outron at the 5' end of the mRNA, in the absence of a functional 5' splice site upstream. When the 5' outron in spliced, the 5' splice site of the spliced leader RNA is branched to the outron and forms an intermediate. This step results in a free spliced leader exon. The exon is then spliced to the first exon on the pre-mRNA and the intermediate is released. Trans-splicing differs from cis-splicing in that there is no 5' splice site on the pre-mRNA. Instead the 5' splice site is provided by the SL sequence.

== Trans-splicing between sense and anti-sense strands ==
As a result of the sense strand undergoing transcription, a pre-mRNA is formed that complements the sense strand. The anti-sense strand is also transcribed resulting in a complementary pre-mRNA strand. The exons from the two transcripts are spliced together to form a chimeric mRNA.

== Alternative Trans-splicing ==
Alternative trans-splicing includes intragenic trans-splicing and intergenic trans-splicing. Intragenic trans-splicing involves duplication of exons in the pre-mRNA. Intergenic trans-splicing is characterized by the splicing together of exons formed form the pre-mRNA of two different genes, resulting in trans-genic mRNA.

== See also ==
- Chimera (EST)
