= Mammaglobin =

Mammaglobin is a gene that encodes a 10-kilodalton glycoprotein. In humans, expression of the gene is limited to the adult mammary gland, a correlation between increased expression of the gene and breast cancer has been reported.
