= Larotrectinib =

Chemical compound

Clinical data
- Trade names: Vitrakvi
- Other names: LOXO-101, ARRY-470
- AHFS/Drugs.com: Monograph
- MedlinePlus: a619006
- License data: US DailyMed: Larotrectinib
- Pregnancy category: AU: D
- Routes of administration: By mouth, oropharyngeal
- ATC code: L01EX12 (WHO)

Legal status
- Legal status: AU: S4 (Prescription only); CA: ℞-only; UK: POM (Prescription only); US: ℞-only; EU: Rx-only

Identifiers
- IUPAC name: (3S)-N-{5-[(2R)-2-(2,5-difluorophenyl)pyrrolidin-1-yl]pyrazolo[1,5-a]pyrimidin-3-yl}-3-hydroxypyrrolidine-1-carboxamide
- CAS Number: 1223403-58-4
- PubChem CID: 46188928
- DrugBank: DB14723
- ChemSpider: 44210503
- UNII: PF9462I9HX
- KEGG: D11137; as salt: D11138
- ChEMBL: ChEMBL3889654
- CompTox Dashboard (EPA): DTXSID101020707

Chemical and physical data
- Formula: C_{21}H_{22}F_{2}N_{6}O_{2}
- Molar mass: 428.444 g·mol^{−1}
- 3D model (JSmol): Interactive image
- SMILES: O=C(Nc1cnn2ccc(N3CCC[C@@H]3c3cc(F)ccc3F)nc12)N1CC[C@H](O)C1
- InChI: InChI=1S/C21H22F2N6O2/c22-13-3-4-16(23)15(10-13)18-2-1-7-28(18)19-6-9-29-20(26-19)17(11-24-29)25-21(31)27-8-5-14(30)12-27/h3-4,6,9-11,14,18,30H,1-2,5,7-8,12H2,(H,25,31)/t14-,18+/m0/s1; Key:NYNZQNWKBKUAII-KBXCAEBGSA-N

Larotrectinib, sold under the brand name Vitrakvi, is a medication for the treatment of cancer. It is an inhibitor of tropomyosin kinase receptors TrkA, TrkB, and TrkC. It was discovered by Array BioPharma and licensed to Loxo Oncology in 2013.

Larotrectinib was initially awarded orphan drug status in 2015, for soft tissue sarcoma, and breakthrough therapy designation in 2016 for the treatment of metastatic solid tumors with NTRK fusion. Some clinical trial results were announced in 2017. On 26 November 2018, Larotrectinib was approved by the FDA.

Larotrectinib was the first drug to be specifically developed and approved to treat any cancer containing certain mutations, as opposed to cancers of specific tissues (i.e., the approval is "tissue agnostic"). Several earlier drugs, including pembrolizumab, were eventually approved by the FDA for treatment of specific mutations independent of the type of cancer, but those drugs had been initially developed for specific cancer types. The U.S. Food and Drug Administration (FDA) considers it to be a first-in-class medication.

Larotrectinib was approved for medical use in the European Union in September 2019. It was approved for medical use in Australia in August 2020.

== Research ==
Phase II clinical trials evaluating the drug for efficacy and safety in treating several types of solid tumors are ongoing.
