= Entrectinib =

TKI inhibitor used for cancer treatment

Clinical data
- Trade names: Rozlytrek
- Other names: RXDX-101, NMS-E628
- AHFS/Drugs.com: Monograph
- MedlinePlus: a619049
- License data: US DailyMed: Entrectinib
- Pregnancy category: AU: D
- Routes of administration: By mouth
- Drug class: Antineoplastic agent
- ATC code: L01EX14 (WHO)

Legal status
- Legal status: AU: S4 (Prescription only); CA: ℞-only; UK: POM (Prescription only); US: ℞-only; EU: Rx-only

Identifiers
- IUPAC name: N-[5-(3,5-Difluorobenzyl)-1H-indazol-3-yl]-4-(4-methyl-1-piperazinyl)-2-(tetrahydro-2H-pyran-4-ylamino)benzamide
- CAS Number: 1108743-60-7
- PubChem CID: 25141092
- PubChem SID: 347828307
- DrugBank: DB11986
- ChemSpider: 24808589
- UNII: L5ORF0AN1I
- KEGG: D10926
- ChEBI: CHEBI:195558
- ChEMBL: ChEMBL1983268
- CompTox Dashboard (EPA): DTXSID101026450

Chemical and physical data
- Formula: C_{31}H_{34}F_{2}N_{6}O_{2}
- Molar mass: 560.650 g·mol^{−1}
- 3D model (JSmol): Interactive image
- SMILES: CN1CCN(c2ccc(C(=O)Nc3n[nH]c4ccc(Cc5cc(F)cc(F)c5)cc34)c(NC3CCOCC3)c2)CC1
- InChI: InChI=1S/C31H34F2N6O2/c1-38-8-10-39(11-9-38)25-3-4-26(29(19-25)34-24-6-12-41-13-7-24)31(40)35-30-27-17-20(2-5-28(27)36-37-30)14-21-15-22(32)18-23(33)16-21/h2-5,15-19,24,34H,6-14H2,1H3,(H2,35,36,37,40); Key:HAYYBYPASCDWEQ-UHFFFAOYSA-N

Entrectinib, sold under the brand name Rozlytrek, is an anti-cancer medication used to treat ROS1-positive non-small cell lung cancer and NTRK fusion-positive solid tumors. It is a selective tyrosine kinase inhibitor (TKI), of the tropomyosin receptor kinases (TRK) A, B and C, C-ros oncogene 1 (ROS1) and anaplastic lymphoma kinase (ALK).

The most common side effects include tiredness, constipation, dysgeusia (taste disturbances), edema (swelling with fluid retention), dizziness, diarrhea, nausea (feeling sick), dysesthesia (unpleasant and abnormal feeling when touched), dyspnea (difficulty breathing), anemia (low red blood cell count), increased weight, increased blood creatinine (possible sign of kidney problems), pain, cognitive disorders (problems with ability to think, learn and remember), vomiting, cough, and fever.

It was approved for medical use in Japan in June 2019, in the United States in August 2019, in Australia in May 2020, in the European Union in July 2020, and in China in July 2022.

== Medical uses ==
In the US, entrectinib is indicated to treat patients whose cancers are ROS1-positive (have a specific genetic feature (biomarker)). It is to be used in those with solid tumors that:

- are caused by certain abnormal neurotrophic tyrosine receptor kinase (NTRK) genes, and
- have spread or if surgery to remove their cancer is likely to cause severe complications, and
- there is no acceptable treatment, or the cancer grew or spread on other treatment

Entrectinib is not approved for use in those less than twelve years of age.

In the European Union, entrectinib as monotherapy is indicated for the treatment of adults and adolescents twelve years of age and older with solid tumours expressing a neurotrophic tyrosine receptor kinase (NTRK) gene fusion,

- who have a disease that is locally advanced, metastatic or where surgical resection is likely to result in severe morbidity, and
- who have not received a prior NTRK inhibitor
- who have no satisfactory treatment options.

It is also indicated for the treatment of adults with ROS1 positive, advanced non small cell lung cancer (NSCLC) not previously treated with ROS1 inhibitors.

== Side effects ==
The common side effects of entrectinib include fatigue, constipation, dysgeusia, edema, dizziness, diarrhea, nausea, dysesthesia, dyspnea, myalgia, cognitive impairment, weight gain, cough, vomiting, fever, arthralgia and vision disorders.

The most serious side effects of entrectinib are congestive heart failure, central nervous system effects, skeletal fractures, hepatotoxicity, hyperuricemia, QT prolongation and vision disorders.

== History ==
In the U.S., entrectinib has orphan drug designation and rare pediatric disease designation for the treatment of neuroblastoma and orphan drug designation for treatment of TrkA-, TrkB-, TrkC-, ROS1- and ALK-positive non-small cell lung cancer (NSCLC) and metastatic colorectal cancer (mCRC). It has an EU orphan designation for neuroblastoma. FDA approved entrectinib for people with ROS1-positive, metastatic non-small cell lung cancer and NTRK gene fusion-positive solid tumours. It is first FDA-approved treatment designed to target both ROS1 and NTRK that also shows response in cancer that has spread to the brain. In June 2019, the Japanese Ministry of Health, Labour and Welfare (MHLW) approved the agent for the treatment of adult and pediatric patients with NTRK fusion–positive, advanced recurrent solid tumors.

The U.S. Food and Drug Administration (FDA) approved entrectinib based on the evidence from four clinical trials of 355 patients with various types of solid tumors: Trial 1 (EudraCT 2012-000148-88), Trial 2 (NCT02097810), Trial 3 (NCT02568267), and Trial 4 (NCT02650401). The trials were conducted in the United States, Europe and Asia/Pacific region.

The FDA granted entrectinib accelerated approval, priority review, breakthrough therapy, and orphan drug designation. The approval of Rozlytrek was granted to Genentech, Inc.

== Mechanism of action ==
The process of tumorigenesis frequently involves protein kinase activation events, which can result from either mutations, or chromosomal rearrangements. Gene rearrangements, leading to the expression of constitutively activated fusion tyrosine kinase receptors, have been increasingly identified as a common feature of malignancies over the last three decades, and success has been demonstrated using these rearrangements as targets for drug development.

The expression of such gene fusions in a tumor can create a phenomenon termed 'oncogene addiction' in which the tumor becomes dependent on signaling by the aberrant kinase pathway, thus rendering its survival and continued proliferation exquisitely sensitive to targeted inhibition with small molecule tyrosine kinase inhibitor drugs. Expression of the proteins encoded by these tyrosine kinase fusion genes can, in most cases, be shown to function independently as oncogenic drivers, capable of activating critical downstream pathways involved in the malignant phenotype, resulting in transformation of cells in vitro. Some of the most important kinases that have been shown to undergo rearrangement in human cancers include the anaplastic lymphoma kinase (ALK), ROS1 kinase, and the neurotrophic receptor tyrosine kinases (NTRKs).

Entrectinib is a selective tyrosine kinase inhibitor with specificity, at low nanomolar concentrations, for all of three Trk proteins (encoded by the NTRK1, 2, and 3 genes, respectively) as well as the ROS1, and ALK receptor tyrosine kinases. The drug is orally administered, once daily, and is being studied in patients whose tumors have been shown to have fusions in NTRK1/2/3, ALK, or ROS1. As a ROS1 inhibitor, entrectinib has demonstrated in cellular anti-proliferative studies to have a 36-fold greater potency against ROS1 as compared with another commercially available ROS1 inhibitor, crizotinib.

Target	TrkA	TrkB	TrkC	ROS1	ALK
IC_{50} (nM)	1.7	0.1	0.1	0.2	1.6

Entrectinib has also demonstrated in-vitro efficacy against potential Trk inhibitor resistance mutations such as NTRK1 F589L, NTRK1 V573M, NTRK1 G667S.

== Clinical development ==
Entrectinib is currently being tested in a global phase II basket clinical trial called STARTRK-2. Interim results from two ongoing phase 1 trials have been reported at the 2016 AACR American Association for Cancer Research Conference in April 2016: among the patients treated with entrectinib, four patients had tumors harboring NTRK fusions, including patients with non-small cell lung cancer (NSCLC), mCRC, salivary gland cancer, and astrocytoma.

The preliminary results seen with entrectinib in the phase I studies of patients with NTRK/ROS1/ALK fusions have led to the initiation of an open-label, multicenter, global, phase II basket study to examine the use of entrectinib in patients having tumors with these gene rearrangements. The study will enroll any patient with a solid tumor having evidence of an NTRK/ROS1/ALK fusion, assuming the patient meets all other entry criteria. Examples of such tumor types include NSCLC, mCRC, salivary gland cancer, sarcoma, melanoma, thyroid cancer, glioblastoma, astrocytoma, cholangiocarcinoma, lymphoma and others.

== Society and culture ==
=== Legal status ===
It was approved for medical use in the United States in August 2019, and in Australia in May 2020.

=== Economics ===
Investigations of entrectinib were conducted by Ignyta Pharmaceuticals. On 21 December 2017, Roche announced plans to buy Ignyta for $1.7 billion.

=== Names ===
Entrectinib is the International nonproprietary name (INN).
