= C6orf118 =

Protein-coding gene in the species Homo sapiens

Identifiers
- Aliases: C6orf118, bA85G2.1, dJ416F21.2, chromosome 6 open reading frame 118
- External IDs: MGI: 1914181; HomoloGene: 49841; GeneCards: C6orf118; OMA:C6orf118 - orthologs

Gene location (Human)
Chr.	Chromosome 6 (human)
Band	6q27	Start	165,279,664 bp
Band	6q27	End	165,309,605 bp

Gene location (Mouse)
Chr.	Chromosome 17 (mouse)
Band	17|17 A1	Start	9,207,165 bp
Band	17|17 A1	End	9,230,781 bp
RNA expression pattern
Bgee	Human / Mouse (ortholog); Top expressed in: right uterine tube; olfactory zone of nasal mucosa; bronchial epithelial cell; gonad; testicle; right testis; left testis; ventricular zone; anterior pituitary; right lung / Top expressed in: spermatid; spermatocyte; seminiferous tubule; secondary oocyte; lumbar spinal ganglion; zygote; granulocyte; primary oocyte; submandibular gland; gastrula; More reference expression data
BioGPS	n/a
Orthologs
Species	Human	Mouse
Entrez	168090	66931
Ensembl	ENSG00000112539	ENSMUSG00000023873
UniProt	Q5T5N4	n/a
RefSeq (mRNA)	NM_144980	NM_025851; NM_001347544
RefSeq (protein)	NP_659417	n/a
Location (UCSC)	Chr 6: 165.28 – 165.31 Mb	Chr 17: 9.21 – 9.23 Mb
PubMed search
- Wikidata
View/Edit Human	View/Edit Mouse

C6orf118 (Chromosome 6, Open Reading Frame 118) is a protein in humans (Homo sapiens), which is encoded by the C6orf118 gene. The protein domain, translin-associated factor X-interacting N-terminus (TRAX), is involved in RNA binding and RNA nuclease activity and in the regulation of mitochondrial function and cellular homeostasis. TRAX interacts with translin, a DNA-binding protein that binds to consensus sequences at breakpoint junctions of chromosomal translocation. TRAX in general contains bipartite nuclear targeting sequences, which may provide nuclear transport for translin, as translin lacks any nuclear targeting motifs. This protein is localized to the mitochondria.

Earlier experiments involving mutant cells showed deletion of translin in mice (Mus musculus) leads to a complete loss of TRAX protein without affecting TRAX mRNA levels, indicating the stability of TRAX protein is dependent on the interaction with translin.

== Gene ==
=== Locus ===
C6orf118 is a gene located on the minus (-) strand at 6q27. It is situated between a low-expressed, spliced, non-coding cheeserbu gene and the Phosphodiesterase 10A (PDE10A) gene.

Locus. C6orf118 gene in Chromosome 6 is highlighted in the red band.

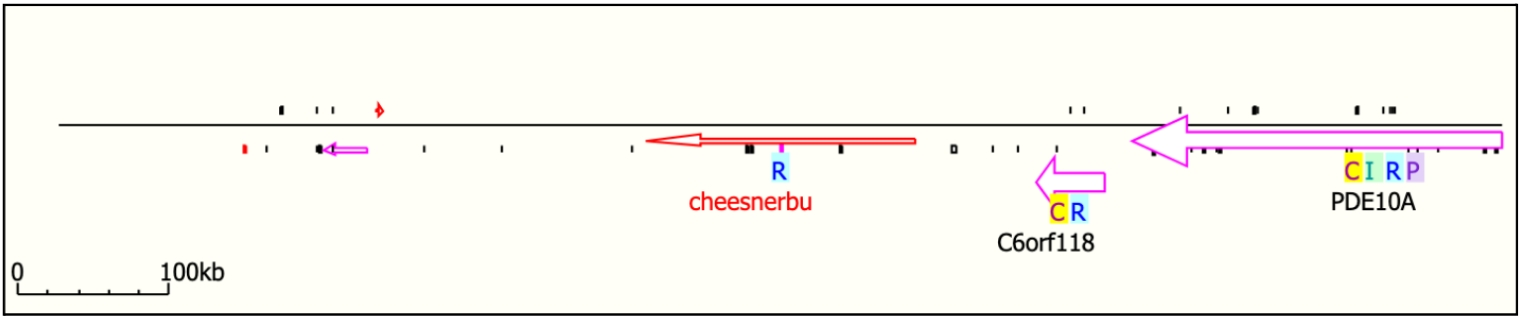
Gene neighbors. C6orf118 is situated between a low-expression, spliced, non-coding cheesnerbu gene (in red) and the Phosphodiesterase 10A (PDE10A) gene. Abbreviation used: R = regulation, C = conservation (conserved domains or proteins found in another species), I = interactions with other genes or proteins, and P = publications in PubMed attached to a gene.

=== Common aliases ===
The gene has several aliases, including BA85G2.1, MGC23884, and DJ416F21.23.

=== Number of exons ===
The gene contains 14 exons and spans approximately 29,942 base pairs.

=== Span of gene ===
C6orf118 spans from 29,941 base pairs. The only one

== Transcripts ==
=== Known isoforms ===
C6orf118 gene produces multiple alternatively spliced transcripts. The gene contains 14 distinct introns and produces 8 alternatively spliced mRNAs, with the longest mRNA length of 2082 nucleotides. Isoform 1 displays higher than normal levels of positive charges KR, which are conserved in all orthologs. C6orf118 isoform 1 does not contain any transmembrane region. Isoforms X5 and X6 do not contain exons 7 and 8, while isoform X2 does not contain exon 3. Coding sequence starts from exon 2 through 7.

Known isoform transcripts and its characteristics
Isoform, transcript length, protein length, molecular weight	AC#	Ex1	Ex2	Ex3	Ex4	Ex5	Ex6	Ex7	Ex8	Ex9
Isoform 1,1822nt,469aa,~53.8kDa	NM_144980	x	x	x	x	x	x	x		x
X1,2082nt,536aa,~60.8kDa	XM_011535509	x	x	x	x	x	x	x	x	x
X2,2022nt,516aa,~58.4kDa	XM_011535510	x	x		x	x	x	x	x	x
X3,2026nt,504aa,~57.2kDa	XM_011535511	x	x	x	x	x	x	x		x
X4,1878nt,469aa,~57.2kDa	XM_005266838	x	x	x	x	x	x	x	x	x
X5,1747nt,483aa,~54.5kDa	XM_017010323	x	x	x	x	x	x			x
X6,1543nt,448aa,~50.9kDa	XM_047418256	x	x	x	x	x	x			x
X7,1944nt,397aa,~45.3kDa	XM_011535512	x	x	x	x	x	x	x	x	x

== Protein ==
=== Isoform 1 ===
Isoform 1, the most common protein, is derived from transcript variant 1 and is 469 amino acids in length, with a molecular weight of ~53.8 kDa, and a pI of 8.61. Isoform X5 and X7 do not contain the TSNAXIP1_N domain.

=== Domains and motifs by homology ===
C6orf118 isoform 1 is predicted to contain 4 phosphorylation sites, 2 acetylation sites, 6 O-ß-GlcNAc attachment sites, and 1 N-terminal acetylation.

=== Secondary structure ===
C6orf118 isoform 1 is shown to be dominated primarily by 16 helical secondary structure, with no consistent prediction of beta sheet conformations from AlphaFold and iTasser.

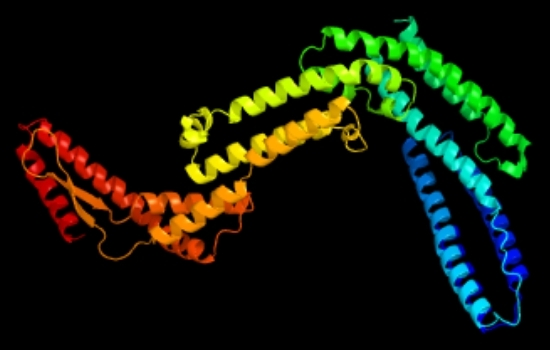
Predicted tertitary structure for C6orf118 by Phyre2.

=== Tertitary structure ===
Prediction of tertitary structure tends to showcase three or four different alpha helices that wrap around itself. Structural predictions of isoform X5 show that the alpha helices do not wrap themselves as other isoforms, which have exons 7 and 8.

== Gene level regulation ==
=== Promoter ===
C6orf118 have 2 possible promoters that produce complete protein isoforms, with 22 nucleotides apart from each other. The primary promoter are found in isoform 1, X4 and X6, while the secondary promoter are found in X1, X2, X3, X5, and X7.

=== Transcription factor binding sites ===
C6orf118 isoform 1 promoter contains 300 transcription factor binding sites, only TFAP2A is conserved among mammals.

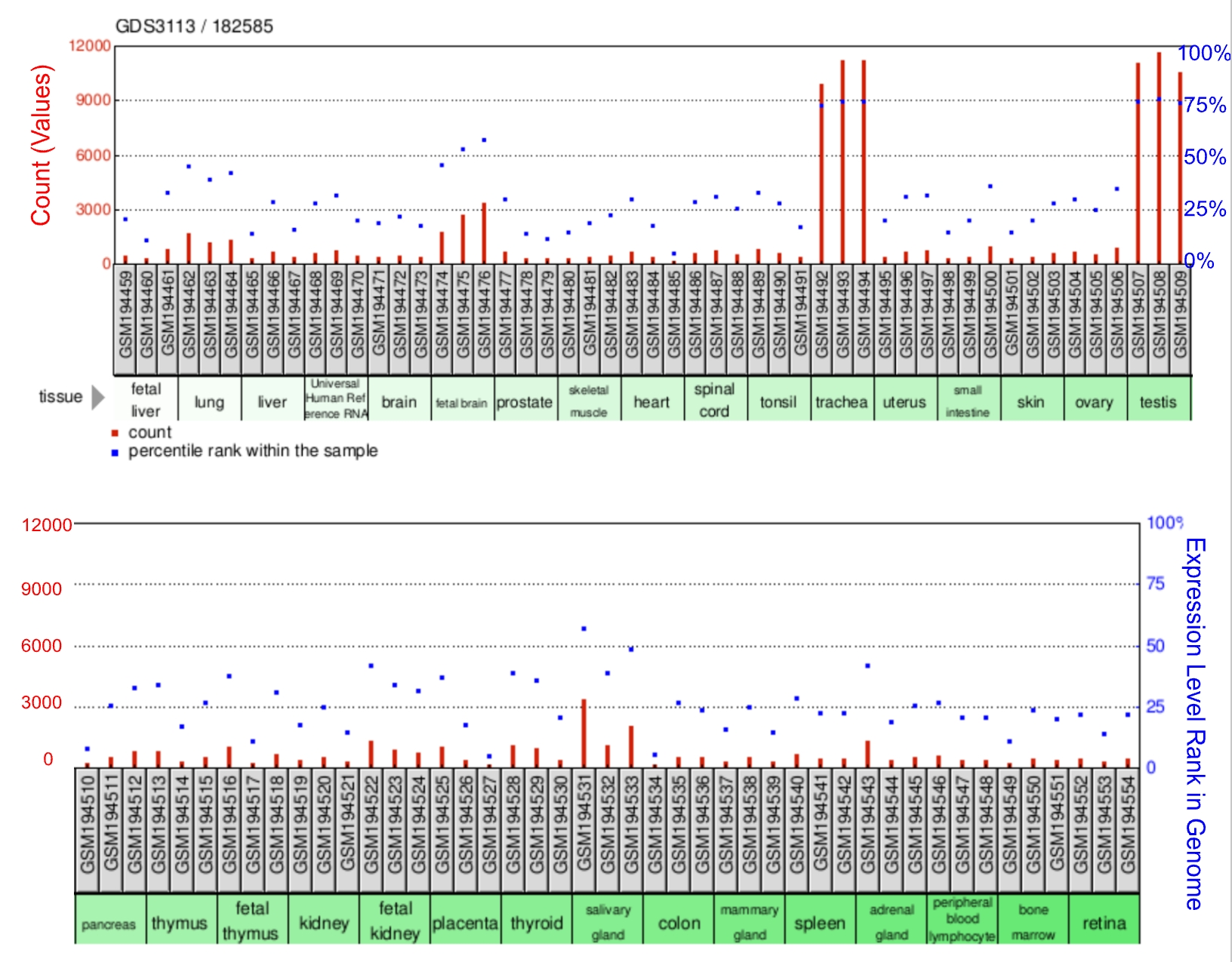
Microarray-assessed tissue expression pattern of C6orf118 from NCBI GEO. Data from GDS3113

=== Expression pattern ===
C6orf118 expression is expressed ubiquitously at low to medium levels in most tissue types. Due to the low levels of expression, meaningful trends in localization are difficult to discern. However, some of the RNA sequence data indicate a high expression level in the brain and lung. NCBI GEO profile across all tissues indicate that it is expressed medium to high levels in fetal brain, trachea, salivary gland, and testis. The protein is less abundant than most human proteins.

== Transcript level regulation ==
=== mRNA localization ===
C6orf118 mRNA is localized in cytoplasm within various cell types, including ciliated, basal respiratory, club cells, and ionocytes.

=== Predicted stem loops ===
5' UTR indicate that one stem loop upstream of the start of transcription is conserved in all Primates. Within the stem loop, EWSR1-FLI1 binding site is found.

3' UTR contain 6 stem loops, although only one is conserved in all Primates.

=== miRNA targeting ===
56 different miRNAs are found within the 3' UTR in human's transcript 1.

== Protein level regulation ==
=== Subcellular localization ===
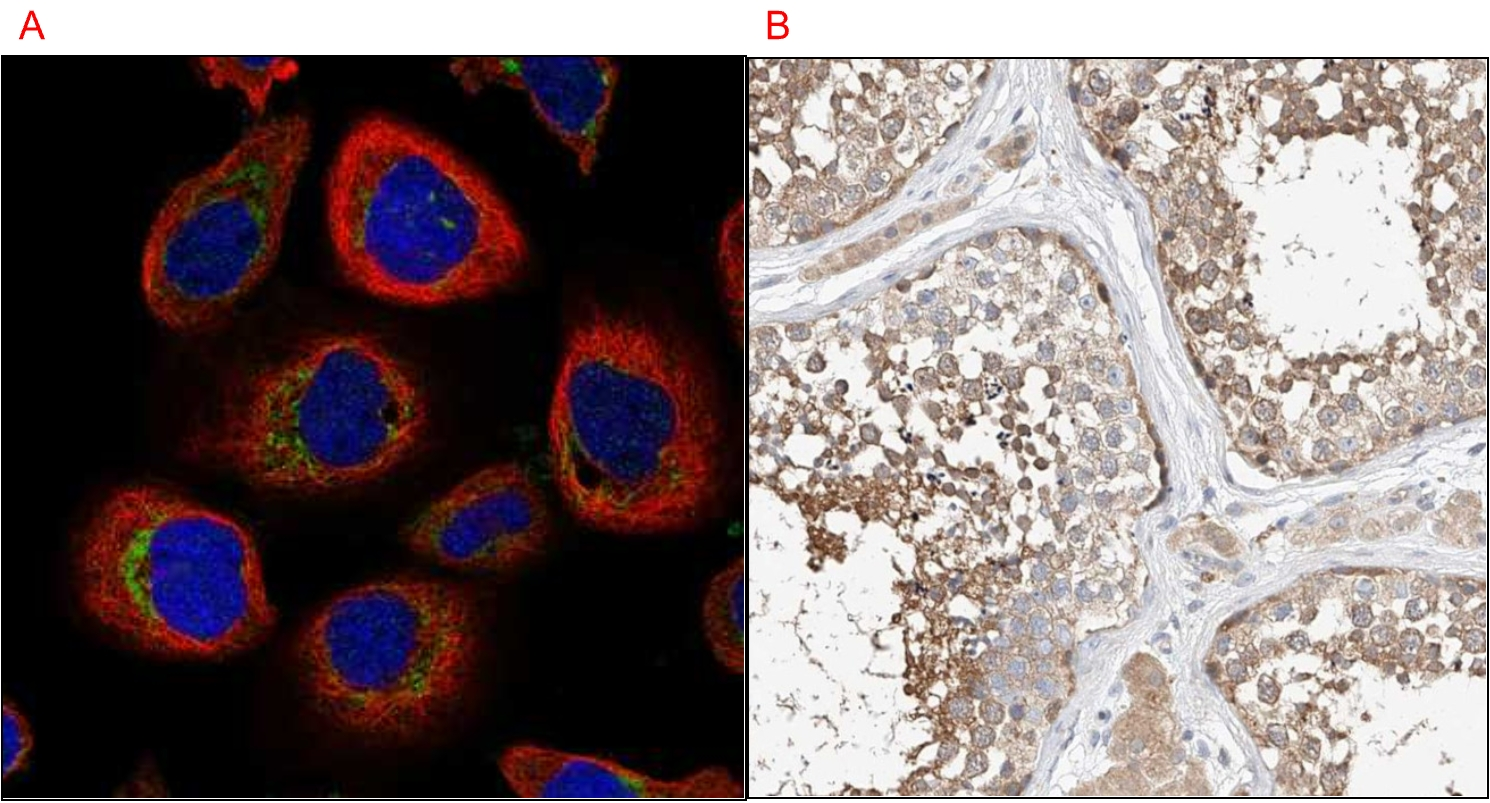
Antibody staining results from The Human Protein Atlas. Immunocytochemical antibody staining results are listed as showing localization to the cytoplasm (Green, frame A). Immunohistochemical results show strong presence of this protein in the cytoplasm (Brown, frame B).

The lack of a transmembrane domain indicates that C6orf118 isoform 1 is not found within the cell membrane. Analysis of likely subcellular localization among orthologs indicates C6orf118 products are most likely found in the nucleus, cytosol, and mitochondria. Both immunocytochemical and immunohistochemical imaging shows C6orf118 is localized in the cytoplasm but most likely where mitochondrions are located.

=== Acetylation ===
One N-terminal acetylation was found to be conserved in mammals, birds, and reptiles. This is probable due to the protein being extremely stable, localized, and having a low degradation level despite a low translation rate.

=== Glycosylation ===
Multiple O-glycosylation sites were found, with conserved position at 32, 92, 192, 203, 345, and 373 in the human protein.

=== Phosphorylation ===
C6orf118 is predicted to have 4 phosphorylation sites. The presence of phosphorylation sites at 210, 211, and 327 are common among mammals, birds, and reptiles.

== Homology ==
=== Paralogs ===
There are 2 known paralogs to this gene: forkhead box protein (FOX), and SH3 domain and tetratricopeptide repeat-containing protein 2 (SH3TC2). C6orf118 and FOX in humans have similarity and identity percents of 16% and 10.7%, respectively. C6orf118 and SH3TC2 have similarity and identity percents of 10.3% and 6.9%, respectively.

=== Orthologs ===
C6orf118 in Homo sapiens is found in all life forms. The table below shows orthologs 20 orthologs of C6orf118. C6orf118 first appeared in archaea and is found in organisms as distantly related to humans as the fungus Chytridiales, which diverged about 1275 million years ago with an average sequence identity of 21.1%. The table highlights 20 selected orthologs from various groups arranged by median date of divergence and then by sequence identity from the human lineage. The C6orf118 amino acid sequences of mammals are closely related to humans, with an average sequence similarity of 67.9%. The bird and reptile, amphibian, fish, and invertebrate are distantly related with the average sequence similarity of 33.7%, 40.9%, 36.2%, 31.5%, respectively. In general, the samples follow the pattern where the more recent evolutionary diversion results in more similar proteins. However, there are some exceptions, as seen in the inverted similarity between mouse and fishing cat, sun bittern, and whale shark.

==== Table of orthologs ====
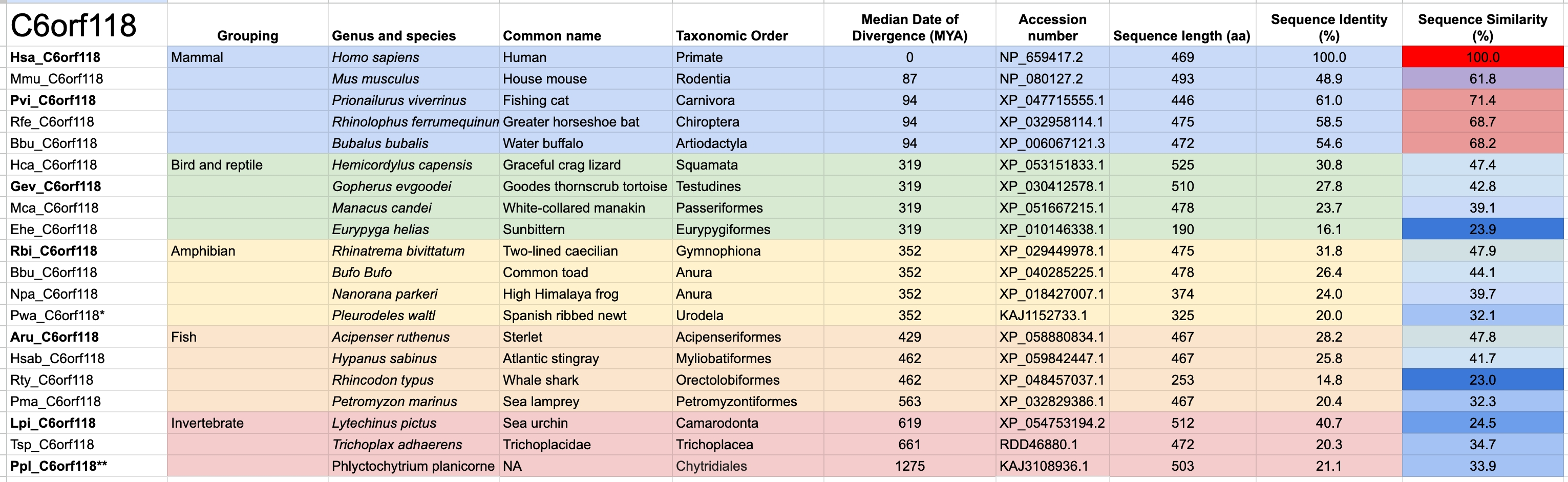
Orthologs of C6orf118 in Humans. Sorted first by the median date of divergence, then by sequence identity to human protein. Rainbow color is used to separate different groups of animals. Red tiles indicate high similarity (68-100%), white tiles indicate moderately similarity (51-67%) to the human sequence, while blue tiles indicate low similarity (23-50%) and are distantly related. Pairwise sequence alignment was used to obtain sequence identity and similarity. *Hypothetical protein NDU88_005508; **Hypothetical protein HDU97_009669

=== Rate of evolution ===
C6orf118 is evolving moderately quickly compared to reference sequences Cytochrome C and Fibrinogen alpha. The figure below shows more detail about the evolutionary history of C6orf118, FOX, and SH3TC2. Protein FOX almost has a similar rate of sequence divergence compared to C6orf118, indicating the amino acid sequence changes are about the same and are moderately quickly. SH3TC2 is found in mammals, birds, reptiles, amphibians, and bony fish but is not found in invertebrates and fungi. NCBI results suggest that the gene C6orf118 duplicated to create SH3TC2 paralog between 429 and 462 million years ago.

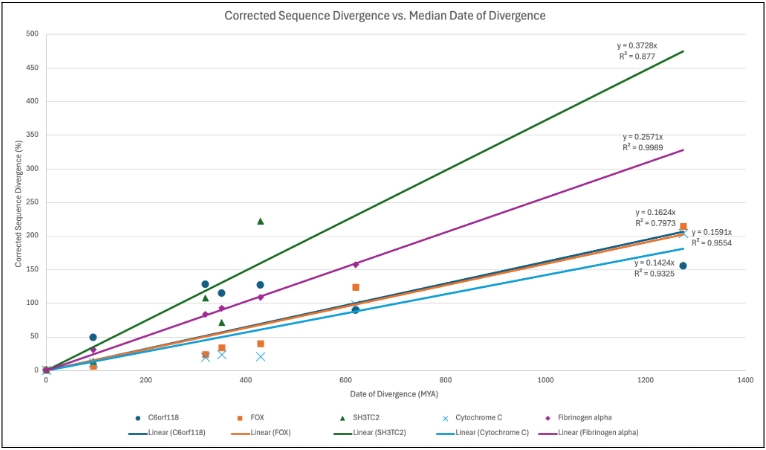
Corrected Sequence Divergence vs. Estimated Date of Divergence from humans C6orf118. EMBOSS Needle were used to align Homo sapiens protein with Prionailurus viverrinus, Gopherus evgoodei, Rhinatrema bivittatum, Acipenser ruthenus, Lytechinus pictus, and Phlyctochytrium planicorne. No data were found for SH3TC2 in L. pictus and P. planicorne. No data were found for fibrinogen alpha for P. planicorne. Corrected sequence divergence % were obtained using the formula m = -ln(1-n/100) * 100. Where n = 1 - identity in decimal.

=== Distant homologs ===
The distant homologs of C6orf118 cover the mammals, birds, and reptiles in the Table of orthologs of C6orf118. Most conserved regions are found in exon 2 and exon 7.

== Interacting proteins ==
=== Possible transcription factors ===
Three transcriptional factors, HOXD9, HOXA10, and CDX1, overlap each other in the promoter sequence site. Near the start of transcription, RunX1 and Bcl11B are found opposite in the double strand, indicating competition for attachment to the sequence. Both ZNF213 and EWSR1-FLI1 bind very closely to the start of transcription at the 5' UTR, indicating both play crucial roles in regulating gene expression.

==== HOXD9, HOXA10, CDX1 ====
HOXD9, HOXA10, and CDX1 belong to the Homeobox proteins family. HOXD9 plays an important role in morphogenesis in all multicellular organisms, and deletion of this gene is associated with severe limb and genital abnormalities. Similarly, HOXA10 regulates gene expression, morphogenesis, and differentiation that are crucial for embryo viability. CDX1 is also recognized for its role in embryonic epicardial development, but the mechanism of how these transcriptional factors regulate is poorly understood. It was hypothesized that HOXD9 can act as both an activator and repressor, while HOXA10 and CDX1 primarily function as activators.

==== RunX1 and Bcl11B ====
Runt-related transcription factor (RunX1) function in humans was not well understood. It has been suggested to play a role in regulating differentiation of hematopoietic stem cells into mature blood cells. RUNX proteins form a heterodimeric complex with CBFβ which confers increased DNA binding and stability to the complex.

B-cell lymphoma/leukemia 11B (Bcl11B) is a protein that may be associated with B-cell malignancies. It was hypothesized that RunX1 is primarily involved in activation, while BCL11B can induce both activation and inhibition of C6orf118 transcription.

==== ZNF213 and EWSR1-FLI1 ====
Zinc Finger Protein 217 (ZNF213) is a protein that attenuate apoptotic signals and promote breast cancer progression. ZNF213 has a bipartite structure, with one domain binding to DNA and the other modulating target gene expression. Studies have indicated that ZNF213 plays a role in cell differentiation and development.

EWSR1-FLI1 refers to a fusion protein that combines the transcriptional activation domain of EWSR1 with the DNA-binding domain of FLI1. EWSR1-FLI1 deregulate genes involved in tumorigenesis. Thus, it is likely that EWSR1-FLI1 act antagonistically to ZNF213, and likely activate C6orf118.

== Clinical significance ==
=== Disease association ===
==== Mitochondria disease ====
The protein is associated with diseases like Mitochondrial Complex I Deficiency, Nuclear Type 17. This condition is characterized by a deficiency in the mitochondrial respiratory chain complex I, leading to clinical symptoms such as muscle weakness, developmental delay, and neurological abnormalities.

==== Caseous tuberculosis ====
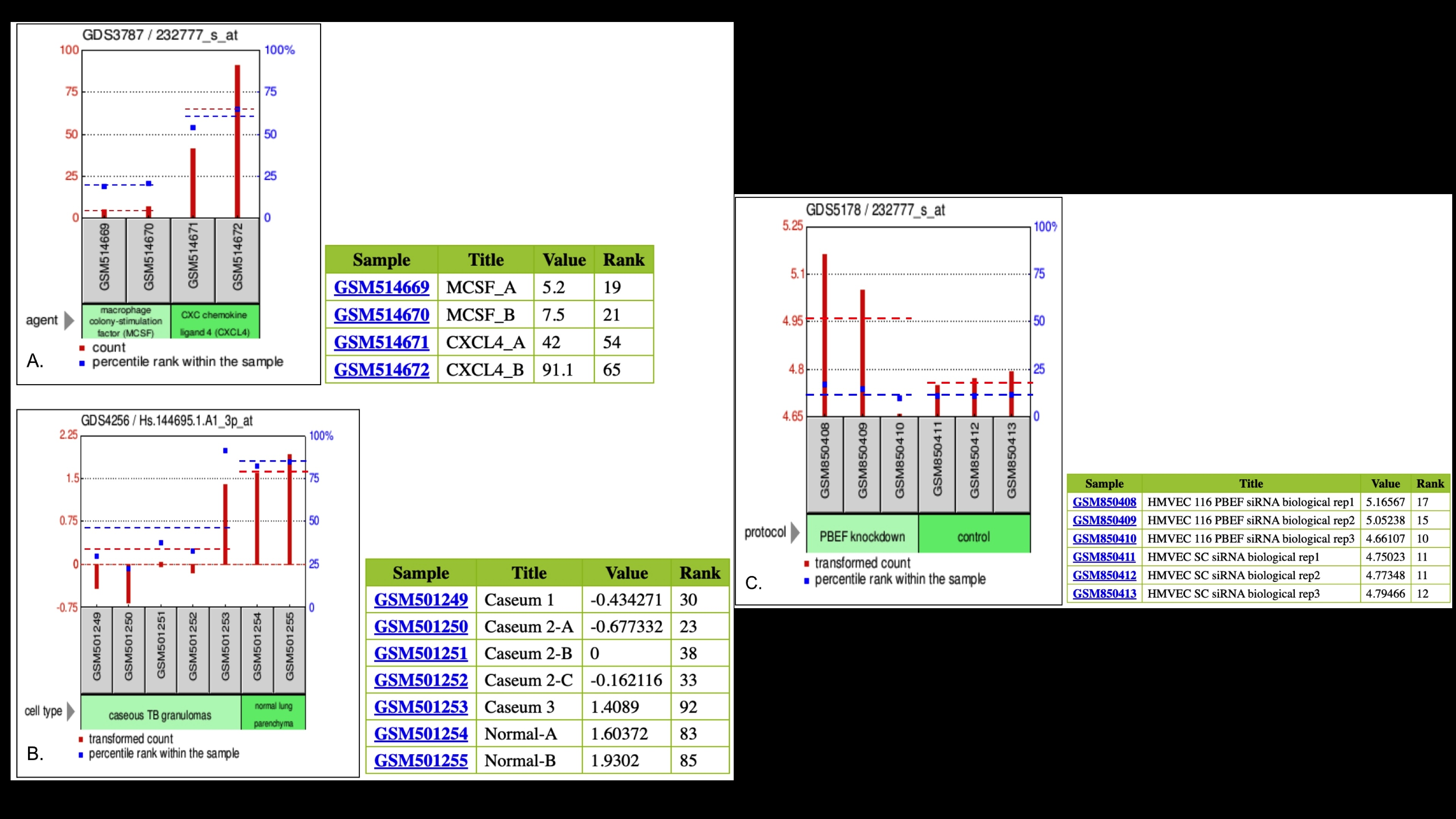
Three microarray data sets under different conditions affecting gene expression. A) Effect of CXCL4 on C6orf118 B) Effect of ITK Deficiency on C6orf118 expression in lung during Mtb infection C) Effect of PBEF Knockout on C6orf118 expression

C6orf118 has been found to be susceptible to tuberculosis. Microarray data were used to compare gene expression in lung tissues from both normal and ITK-deficient individuals during the early stages of Mtb infection, and found that C6orf118 expression was higher in normal lung parenchyma compared to ITK-deficient TB granulomas. The necrotic core and hypoxic conditions in infected cells might suppress the expression of genes involved in RNA processing and degradation.

==== Immune diseases ====
Several studies have link differential C6orf118 functionality to various immune diseases. One study have identified C6orf118 as a potential antagonistic partner with Pre-B cell colony enhancing factor (PBEF). C6orf118 expression is increased by 30% in PBEF siRNA-treated cells compared to the RNA control group. Furthermore, another study reported in NCBI GEO show differential expression of C6orf118 in peripheral blood monocytes that were exposed to macrophage colony-stimulation factor (MCSF) or chemokine-like platelet factor 4 (CXCL4). C6orf118 expression was significantly higher in CXCL4-induced macrophages compared to MCSF-induced macrophages, suggesting CXCL4-deficient individuals could prevent cellular homeostasis and prevent the accumulation of harmful RNA fragments.

=== Mutations (SNPs of interest) ===
At 361 aa there is a missense SNP that may be either a valine (V) or an leucine (L). This SNP is associated with changes in the alpha-helix structure and the ability to interact with other molecule can be found at 1106 bp on transcript variant 1.
