= Mir-708 microRNA precursor family =

mir-708

Identifiers
- Symbol: mir-708
- Rfam: RF00917
- miRBase family: MIPF0000397

Other data
- RNA type: microRNA
- Domain: Eukaryota;
- PDB structures: PDBe

In molecular biology mir-708 microRNA is a short RNA molecule. MicroRNAs function to regulate the expression levels of other genes by several mechanisms. miR-708 is located on chromosome 11q14.1 and is endcoded in intron 1 of the ODZ4 gene. It is most highly expressed in the brain and eyes, and has a supposed role in endoplasmic reticular stress of the eye.

== Ewing's Sarcoma ==
miR-708 has been implicated in the bone-specific Ewing's sarcoma. Upregulation of the DNA repair protein EYA3 in this tumour is mediated by the fusion protein transcription factor EWS/FLI1, which in turn is via repression of miR-708. miR-708 targets the 3'UTR of EYA3, rather than binding directly to its promoter region. High levels of EYA3 in Ewing's sarcoma are accordingly correlated with low levels of miR-708.

== miR-708 and Lung Cancer ==
High miR-708 expression levels are observed in lung cancers due to their oncogenic role in lung cancer tumour growth and progression. miR-708 overexpression results in increased cell proliferation, migration, and invasion, and has therefore been associated with a decreased survival rate in lung epithelial cancers. It directly downregulates the transmembrane protein 88 (TMEM88), a negative regulator of the Wnt signalling pathway.

== See also ==
- MicroRNA
