= EWS/FLI =

Oncogenic protein

EWS/FLI1 is an oncogenic protein that is pathognomonic for Ewing sarcoma. It is found in approximately 90% of all Ewing sarcoma tumors with the remaining 10% of fusions substituting one fusion partner with a closely related family member (e.g. ERG for FLI1).

== Origin ==
EWSR1 is a gene on chromosome 22 whose mRNA is translated into the protein Ewing sarcoma breakpoint region 1 (abbreviated EWS). The gene FLI1 resides on chromosome 11 where it encodes a member of the ETS transcription factor family, Friend leukemia integration 1 transcription factor (abbreviated FLI1).

Most fusions between EWS and FLI1 result from a t(11;22)(q24;q12) reciprocal chromosome translocation. This translocation creates a chimeric transcript which fuses exons 1-7 of EWSR1 to exons 6-9 (or less commonly 5-9) of FLI1.

It has recently been appreciated that almost half of EWS and FLI1 fusions are a result of chromoplexy. Evidence of chromoplectic looping is enriched in both metastatic and p53 mutant tumors. Chromoplectic looping appears to be the mechanism involved in forming the EWS/ERG variant transcription factor. This preference is probably due to EWSR1 and ERG being in opposite orientations on the genome precluding the production of functional EWS/ERG via a reciprocal translocation.

== Molecular Biology ==
EWS/FLI1 functions as both a pioneering transcription factor and potent oncogene. Its expression leads to a complete restructuring of the transcriptome of the cell of origin to favor a tumorigenic state. EWS/FLI1 accomplishes this through a set of complementary mechanisms:

1. The N-terminus of EWS/FLI1 retains the prion-like transactivation domain of EWSR1. This allows EWS/FLI1 to both bind RNA polymerase II and recruit the BAF complex. These interactions change heterochromatin to euchromatin at EWS/FLI1 DNA-binding sites effectively generating de novo enhancers.
2. The C-terminus of EWS/FLI1 retains the DNA-binding domain of FLI1. While wild-type FLI1 recognizes an ACCGGAAG core sequence, EWS/FLI1 preferentially binds GGAA-repetitive regions. There is a positive correlation between the number of consecutive GGAA microsatellites, EWS/FLI1 binding, and target gene expression.
3. The core motif of ETS transcription factors includes a GGAA sequence. EWS/FLI1 may bind to such sequences with greater affinity than the wild-type ETS member disrupting the normal regulation of ETS target genes.
