= ERG (gene) =

Protein-coding gene in humans

Identifiers
- Aliases: ERG, erg-3, p55, ETS-related gene, v-ets avian erythroblastosis virus E26 oncogene homolog, ETS transcription factor, ETS transcription factor ERG
- External IDs: OMIM: 165080; MGI: 95415; GeneCards: ERG
Available structures
PDB	Ortholog search: PDBe RCSB
PDB	List of PDB id codes 1SXE, 4IRG, 4IRH, 4IRI

Gene location (Human)
Chr.	Chromosome 21 (human)
Band	21q22.2	Start	38,380,027 bp
Band	21q22.2	End	38,661,780 bp

Gene location (Mouse)
Chr.	Chromosome 16 (mouse)
Band	16 C4|16 56.04 cM	Start	95,160,028 bp
Band	16 C4|16 56.04 cM	End	95,387,452 bp
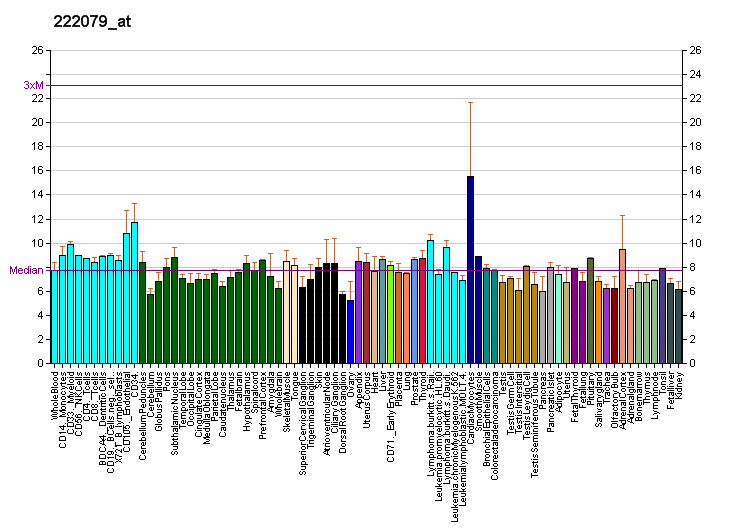

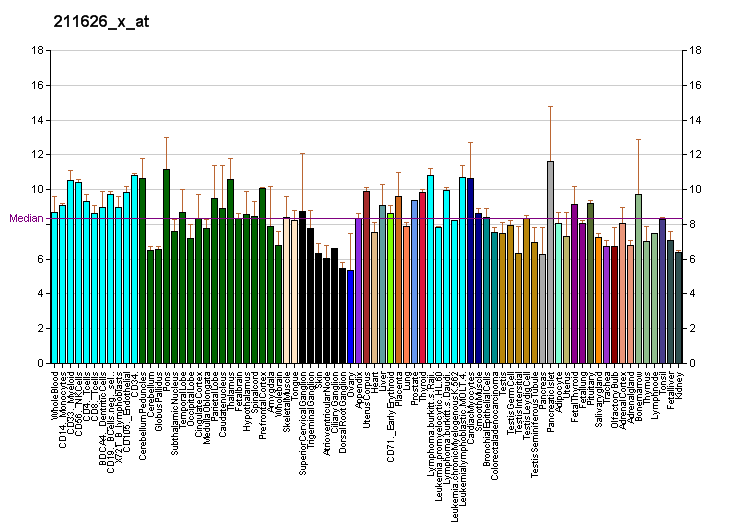

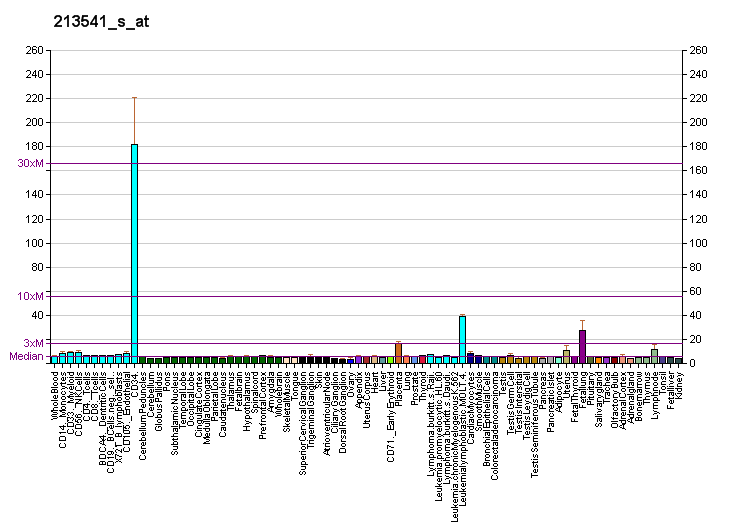
RNA expression pattern
Bgee	Human / Mouse (ortholog); Top expressed in: tendon of biceps brachii; Descending thoracic aorta; ascending aorta; visceral pleura; tibial arteries; sural nerve; subcutaneous adipose tissue; right lung; upper lobe of left lung; spleen / Top expressed in: ascending aorta; external carotid artery; aortic valve; endothelial cell of lymphatic vessel; granulocyte; internal carotid artery; left lung lobe; zygote; phalanx of foot; yolk sac; More reference expression data
BioGPS	More reference expression data
Gene ontology
Molecular function	DNA binding; sequence-specific DNA binding; DNA-binding transcription factor activity; chromatin binding; signal transducer activity; protein binding; RNA polymerase II cis-regulatory region sequence-specific DNA binding; DNA-binding transcription activator activity, RNA polymerase II-specific; DNA-binding transcription factor activity, RNA polymerase II-specific
Cellular component	cytoplasm; nucleus; ribonucleoprotein complex
Biological process	cell differentiation; regulation of transcription, DNA-templated; endocardial cushion development; endocardial cushion to mesenchymal transition involved in heart valve formation; transcription, DNA-templated; multicellular organism development; positive regulation of blood vessel remodeling; protein phosphorylation; cell population proliferation; cell migration; signal transduction; positive regulation of transcription by RNA polymerase II; transcription by RNA polymerase II; regulation of transcription by RNA polymerase II
Sources:Amigo / QuickGO
Orthologs
Databases	NCBI: entry; OMA: entry
Species	Human	Mouse
Entrez	2078	13876
Ensembl	ENSG00000157554	ENSMUSG00000040732
UniProt	P11308	P81270
RefSeq (mRNA)	NM_001136154; NM_001136155; NM_001243428; NM_001243429; NM_001243432 NM_001243433; NM_001291391; NM_004449; NM_182918; NM_001331025	NM_133659; NM_001302152; NM_001302153; NM_001302154; NM_001302179 NM_001302183
RefSeq (protein)	NP_001129626; NP_001129627; NP_001230357; NP_001230358; NP_001230361 NP_001278320; NP_001317954; NP_004440; NP_891548	NP_001289081; NP_001289082; NP_001289083; NP_001289108; NP_001289112 NP_598420
Location (UCSC)	Chr 21: 38.38 – 38.66 Mb	Chr 16: 95.16 – 95.39 Mb
PubMed search
- Wikidata
View/Edit Human	View/Edit Mouse

Transcriptional regulator ERG is a protein that in humans is encoded by the ERG gene. ERG is a member of the ETS (erythroblast transformation-specific) family of transcription factors. Genes in the ETS family regulate embryonic development, cell proliferation, differentiation, angiogenesis, inflammation, and apoptosis.

== Gene ==
ERG is located on chromosome 21.

== Tissue distribution ==
The ERG protein is expressed at a similar level throughout the body.

== Function ==
Transcriptional regulator ERG is a nuclear protein that binds purine-rich sequences of DNA. Transcriptional regulator ERG is required for platelet adhesion to the subendothelium and regulates hematopoiesis. It has a DNA binding domain and a PNT (pointed) domain. ERG is expressed at higher levels in early myelocytes than in mature lymphocytes (types of white blood cells). Therefore, ERG may act as a regulator of differentiation of early hematopoietic cells.

The Mld2 mutation, generated through an ENU mutagenesis screen, was the first non-functional allele of Erg. Homozygous Mld2 is embryonic lethal at day 13.5. Adult mice heterozygous for the Mld2 mutation have hematopoietic stem cell defects. This means that when the ERG gene was not actively transcribed and the ERG protein produced, a mouse's hematopoietic cells were unable to function properly. Since ERG is important to the ability of the hematopoietic cells to function and self-renew, there may be applications in using blood stem cells for tissue repair, transplantation and other therapeutic applications.

=== Vascular development ===
ERG plays important role in blood vessel formation and maintain vascular homeostasis. Several reports indicate ERG critically maintains Endothelial cell lineage. Unlike other ETS transcription factors, ERG is reported to have EC-restricted pattern of expression where it regulates number of endothelial-specific genes including vWF, angiopoietin-2, endoglin, and VE-cadherin. ERG is also known to control Wnt/β-catenin pathway and endothelial junctional integrity. Due to their important role in vascular development, constitutive deletion of ERG in mice is known to cause severe vascular defects and embroyonic lethality.

=== Regulation of interleukin 8 ===
ERG exhibits anti-inflammatory effects in endothelial cells by transcriptionally repressing a potent leukocyte chemotactic factor, IL8. Previous studies have shown that ERG gene is known to bind IL-8 promoter and suppress IL-8 expression. As inflammatory cytokines such as TNF-alpha are known to degrade ERG, there is potent generation of IL-8 proteins leading to neutrophil chemotaxis towards the endothelial cells. Cxcr2 antogonist that prevent IL-8 from binding to the cells are known to suppress the neutrophil influx.

== Cancer ==
This gene can be classified as a proto-oncogene. During chromosomal translocations that occur in cell division, ERG can be transposed onto another chromosome. This results in gene fusion products, which can lead to unregulated cell proliferation. Examples of these fusion gene products would be TMPRSS2-ERG and NDRG1-ERG in prostate cancer, EWS-ERG in Ewing’s sarcoma, and FUS-ERG in acute myeloid leukemia. DNA binding protein ERG fuses with RNA binding proteins EWS and TLS/FUS in Ewing's sarcoma and acute myeloid leukemias respectively and function as transcriptional activators. ERG and its fusion proteins EWS-ERG and TLS/FUS-ERG inhibit apoptosis. Morpholino splice-switching oligonucleotides have been used to induce exon 4 skipping in prostate cancer cell lines, mouse models and tissue explants, leading to anti-cancer effects, including reduction of proliferation and induction of apoptosis.

=== TMPRSS2 gene fusion ===
ERG can fuse with TMPRSS2 protein to form an oncogenic fusion gene that is commonly found in human prostate cancer, especially in hormone-refractory prostate cancer. This suggests that ERG overexpression may contribute to development of androgen-independence in prostate cancer through disruption of androgen receptor signaling. The fusion gene is critical to the progression of cancer because it inhibits the androgen receptor expression and it binds and inhibits androgen receptors already present in the cell. Essentially TMPRSS2-ERG fusion disrupts the ability of the cells to differentiate into proper prostate cells creating unregulated and unorganized tissue. In 90% of prostate cancers overexpressing ERG, they also possess a fusion TMPRSS2-ERG protein, suggesting that this fusion is the predominant subtype in prostate cancer.

=== EWS gene fusion ===
Ewing's sarcoma is associated with chromosomal translocations, which typically results in fusion genes with transcriptional regulators. This means that the protein transcribes for with the gene could be produced in excess or under- produced resulting in unnatural activity in cells. Typically this is the first step in a cell's progression to malignancy. In about 10% of Ewing's Sarcoma cases have an EWS1-ERG fusion.

=== Fusion with TLS/FUS ===
In acute myeloid leukemia, the t(16;21) translocation in myeloid leukemia fuses TLS/FUS to ERG which disrupts the natural TLS/FUS RNA binding domain, and instead inserting the ERG DNA binding domain.

== Interactions ==
ERG has been shown to interact with:

- C-jun
- ETS2
- EWSR1
- FUS
- TMPRSS2
- USP9X

== See Also ==
FLI1
