= Extraskeletal Ewing sarcoma =

- Other names: Extraosseous Ewing sarcoma
- Specialty: Oncology
- Symptoms: Pain at the site of the tumor
- Complications: Spread
- Usual onset: Rapid, <5years and >35years of age
- Diagnostic method: Medical imaging
- Treatment: Chemotherapy, surgical removal, radiation therapy
- Frequency: 0.4 per million, males=females

Extraskeletal Ewing sarcoma (EES), is a cancer of soft tissue, a type of Ewing sarcoma that does not arise from bone.

== Signs and symptoms ==
It belongs to the Ewing family of tumors. Typical symptoms include pain at the site of the tumor. It can occur in a wide range of parts of the body. It grows rapidly, with the upper leg, upper arms, bottom and shoulders being the most common sites to be affected. At presentation, a quarter of cases have already spread; typically to lungs, bone and bone marrow.

== Diagnosis ==
Diagnosis is by medical imaging, with MRI being more accurate than CT scan, and confirmed by CT-guided or ultrasound-guided core-needle biopsy once a chest CT has excluded spread to lungs. Fluorodeoxyglucose-positron emission tomography is more accurate than a bone scan in detecting spread, and can be used to monitor response to treatment.

== Treatment ==
Chemotherapy and surgical removal are options if the tumor is localised. If it cannot be operated upon, radiation therapy may be effective.

== Epidemiology ==
The tumor is rare. It accounts for around 12% of cases of Ewing sarcoma. It is 10 times less common than Ewing sarcoma of bone and occurs in around 1.4 per million people, with a greater likelihood in under five-year olds and over 35-year olds. There does not appear to be any association with ethnicity or gender.

== History ==
The condition was first reported by Melvin Tefft in 1969.
