= PRMT8 =

Protein-coding gene in humans

Identifiers
- Aliases: PRMT8, HRMT1L3, HRMT1L4, protein arginine methyltransferase 8
- External IDs: OMIM: 610086; MGI: 3043083; GeneCards: PRMT8
Available structures
PDB	Ortholog search: PDBe RCSB
PDB	List of PDB id codes 4X41, 5DST
Enzyme activity
EC #	BRENDA	ExPASy	KEGG	MetaCyc
2.1.1.319	↗	↗	↗	↗

Gene location (Human)
Chr.	Chromosome 12 (human)
Band	12p13.32	Start	3,381,349 bp
Band	12p13.32	End	3,593,973 bp

Gene location (Mouse)
Chr.	Chromosome 6 (mouse)
Band	6|6 F3	Start	127,665,974 bp
Band	6|6 F3	End	127,746,435 bp
RNA expression pattern
Bgee	Human / Mouse (ortholog); Top expressed in: middle temporal gyrus; Brodmann area 23; primary visual cortex; prefrontal cortex; right frontal lobe; nucleus accumbens; dorsolateral prefrontal cortex; caudate nucleus; endothelial cell; superior frontal gyrus / Top expressed in: piriform cortex; lateral septal nucleus; lobe of cerebellum; interventricular septum; cerebellar vermis; subdivision of hippocampus; Region I of hippocampus proper; medial dorsal nucleus; lateral geniculate nucleus; subiculum; More reference expression data
BioGPS	n/a
Gene ontology
Molecular function	methyltransferase activity; transferase activity; protein-arginine omega-N monomethyltransferase activity; S-adenosylmethionine-dependent methyltransferase activity; protein homodimerization activity; protein-arginine omega-N asymmetric methyltransferase activity; protein binding; protein heterodimerization activity; histone-arginine N-methyltransferase activity; identical protein binding; S-adenosyl-L-methionine binding
Cellular component	membrane; nucleus; plasma membrane; cytosol; anchored component of the cytoplasmic side of the plasma membrane
Biological process	methylation; peptidyl-arginine methylation; peptidyl-arginine methylation, to asymmetrical-dimethyl arginine; histone methylation; regulation of protein binding; histone arginine methylation; regulation of transcription, DNA-templated; protein methylation; protein homooligomerization
Sources:Amigo / QuickGO
Orthologs
Databases	NCBI: entry; OMA: entry
Species	Human	Mouse
Entrez	56341	381813
Ensembl	ENSG00000111218	ENSMUSG00000030350
UniProt	Q9NR22	Q6PAK3
RefSeq (mRNA)	NM_001256536; NM_001256537; NM_019854	NM_201371
RefSeq (protein)	NP_001243465; NP_062828	NP_958759
Location (UCSC)	Chr 12: 3.38 – 3.59 Mb	Chr 6: 127.67 – 127.75 Mb
PubMed search
- Wikidata
View/Edit Human	View/Edit Mouse

Protein arginine methyltransferase 8 is a protein that in humans is encoded by the PRMT8 gene. Arginine methylation is a posttranslational modification involved in a number of cellular processes, including DNA repair, RNA transcription, signal transduction and protein compartmentalization. PRMT8 binds and dimethylates Ewing sarcoma breakpoint region 1 (EWS) protein.
