= Primitive neuroectodermal tumor =

Cancer of the developing nervous system

- Other names: PNET
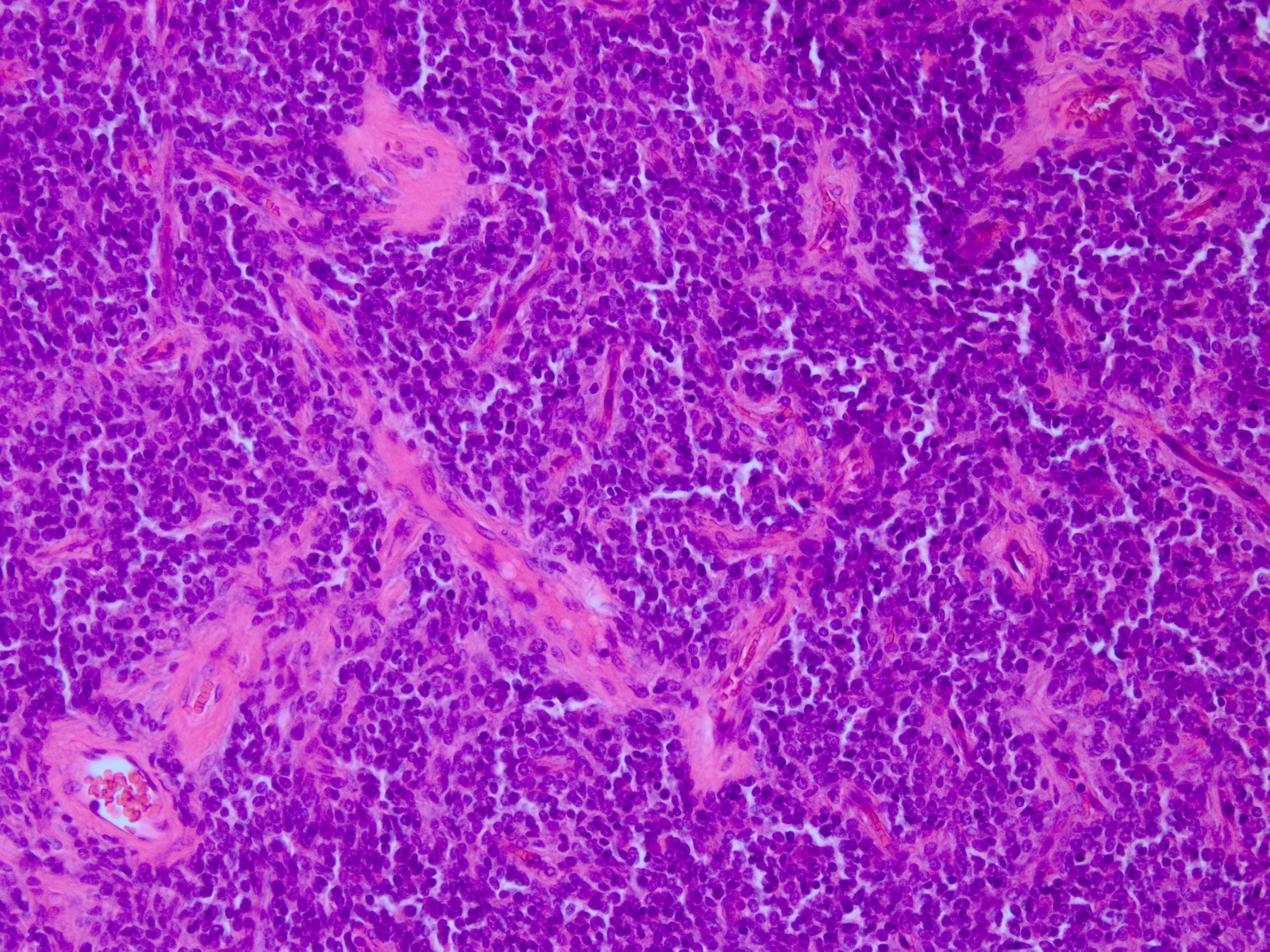
- Micrograph of an H&E stained section of a peripheral PNET.
- Specialty: Oncology

Primitive neuroectodermal tumor is a malignant (cancerous) neural crest tumor. It is a rare tumor, usually occurring in children and young adults under 25 years of age. The overall 5 year survival rate is about 53%.

It gets its name because the majority of the cells in the tumor are derived from neuroectoderm, but have not developed and differentiated in the way a normal neuron would, and so the cells appear "primitive". PNET belongs to the Ewing family of tumors.

== Genetics ==
Using gene transfer of SV40 large T-antigen in neuronal precursor cells of rats, a brain tumor model was established. The PNETs were histologically indistinguishable from the human counterparts and have been used to identify new genes involved in human brain tumor carcinogenesis. The model was used to confirm p53 as one of the genes involved in human medulloblastomas, but since only about 10% of the human tumors showed mutations in that gene, the model can be used to identify the other binding partners of SV40 Large T- antigen, other than p53.

== Diagnosis ==
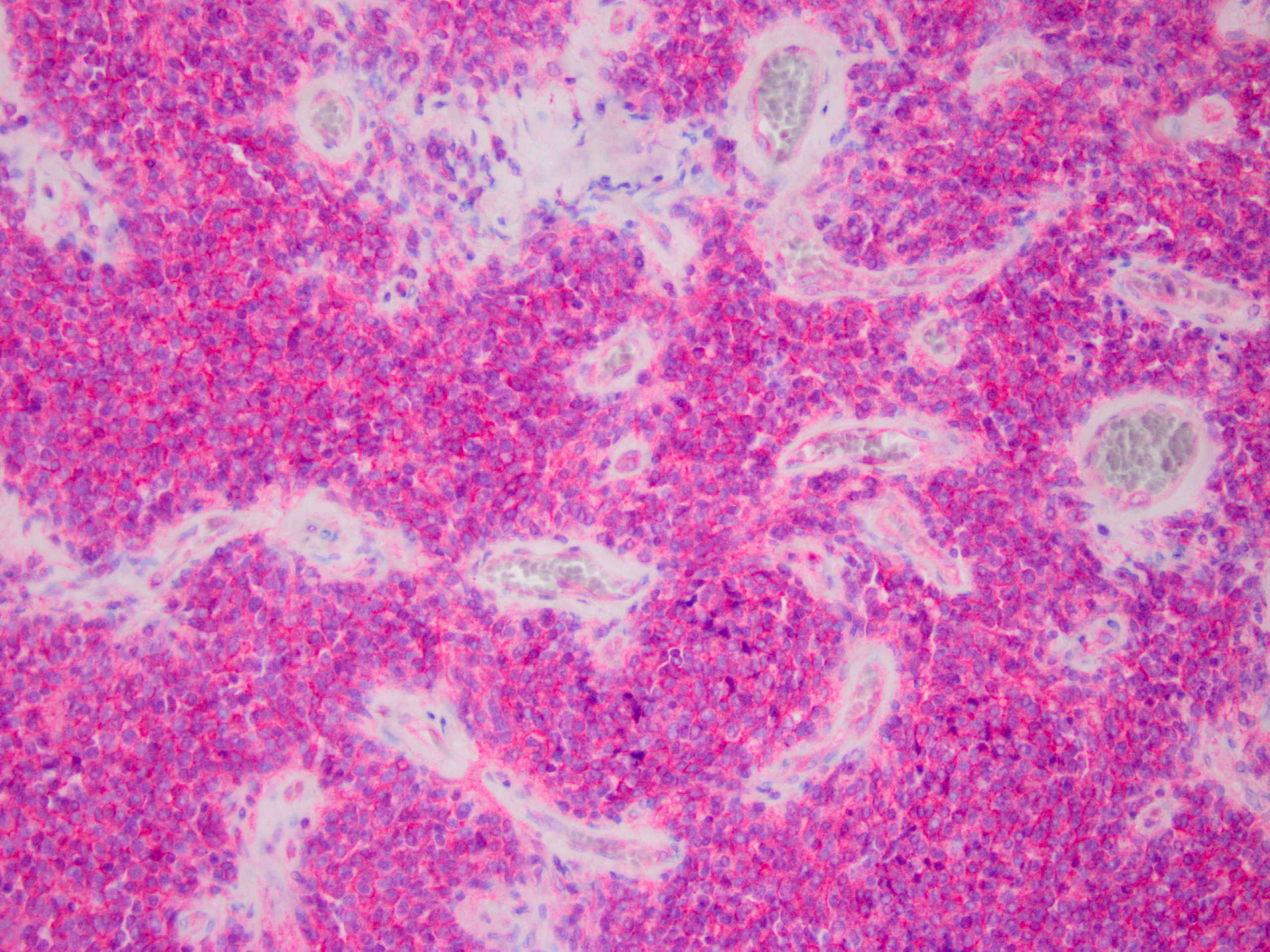
CD99 staining of tissue from peripheral PNET

=== Classification ===
It is classified into two types, based on location in the body: peripheral PNET and CNS PNET.

==== Peripheral PNET ====
The peripheral PNET (pPNET) is now thought to be virtually identical to Ewing sarcoma:

"Current evidence indicates that both Ewing's sarcoma and PNET have a similar neural phenotype and, because they share an identical chromosome translocation, they should be viewed as the same tumor, differing only in their degree of neural differentiation. Tumors that demonstrate neural differentiation by light microscopy, immunohistochemistry, or electron microscopy have been traditionally labeled PNETs, and those that are undifferentiated by these analyses have been diagnosed as Ewing's sarcoma."

==== PNET of the CNS ====
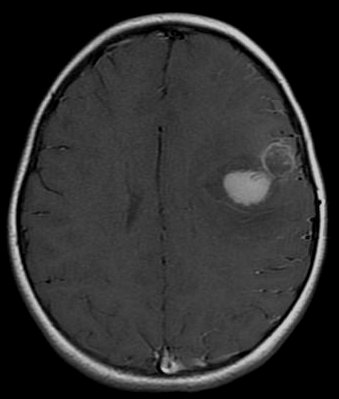
Supratentorial central PNET in a 5-year-old patient

PNET of the CNS generally refer to supratentorial PNETs.

- In the past medulloblastomas were considered PNETs; however, they are genetically, transcriptionally and clinically distinct. As such, "infratentorial" PNETs are now referred to as medulloblastoma.
- Pineoblastomas are embryonal tumours originating in the pineal gland and are likely distinct from supratentorial PNETs.

== Treatment ==
The approach to management of a CNS PNET is first to obtain detailed imaging through MRI, as well as additional scans of the patient's body (X-ray, CT, PET, even bone marrow biopsies) to look for metastasis or other associated malignancies. The tumor will then need to be biopsied to confirm the diagnosis. After the diagnosis of a CNS PNET is confirmed, management includes neoadjuvant chemotherapy and radiation (to reduce tumor size burden), complete surgical resection with confirmed negative margins, and/or additional adjuvant post-surgical chemotherapy. CNS PNET is aggressive and must be managed as so. Palliative care services should also become involved in the patient's care team when the diagnosis is made.

== See also ==
- Medulloblastoma
- Ependymoma
- Ewing family of tumors
