= Pnet =

PNET may refer to:

- Peaceful Nuclear Explosions Treaty
- Primitive neuroectodermal tumor
- Pancreatic neuroendocrine tumor
