= Small nuclear ribonucleoprotein polypeptide C =

Protein-coding gene in the species Homo sapiens

SNRPC
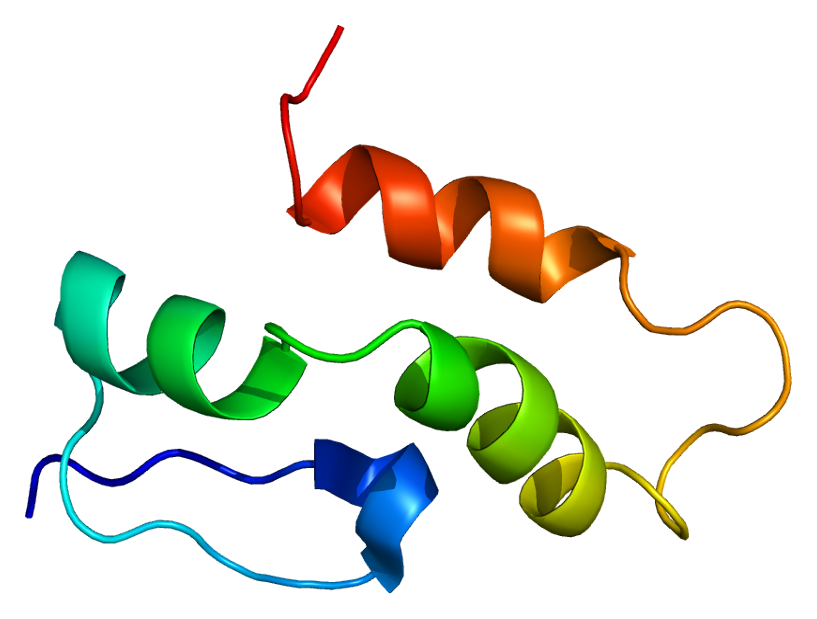

Identifiers
- Aliases: SNRPC, U1C, Yhc1, Small nuclear ribonucleoprotein polypeptide C
- External IDs: OMIM: 603522; MGI: 109489; GeneCards: SNRPC
Available structures
PDB	Ortholog search: PDBe RCSB
PDB	List of PDB id codes 2VRD, 3CW1, 4PJO

Gene location (Human)
Chr.	Chromosome 6 (human)
Band	6p21.31	Start	34,757,505 bp
Band	6p21.31	End	34,773,857 bp

Gene location (Mouse)
Chr.	Chromosome 17 (mouse)
Band	17|17 A3.3	Start	28,057,124 bp
Band	17|17 A3.3	End	28,070,942 bp
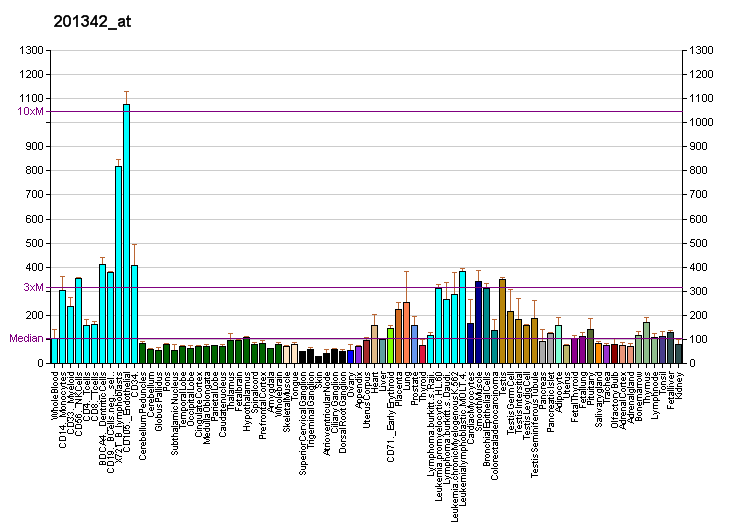
RNA expression pattern
Bgee	Human / Mouse (ortholog); Top expressed in: apex of heart; left testis; right testis; right auricle of heart; left ventricle; mucosa of transverse colon; ventricular zone; ganglionic eminence; muscle of thigh; gastrocnemius muscle / Top expressed in: yolk sac; ventricular zone; embryo; morula; embryo; neural layer of retina; muscle of thigh; granulocyte; blastocyst; lip; More reference expression data
BioGPS	More reference expression data
Gene ontology
Molecular function	protein homodimerization activity; zinc ion binding; metal ion binding; protein binding; single-stranded RNA binding; nucleic acid binding; U1 snRNA binding; pre-mRNA 5'-splice site binding; U1 snRNP binding; RNA binding; mRNA binding
Cellular component	Cajal body; prespliceosome; U1 snRNP; nucleus; commitment complex; nucleoplasm; U2-type prespliceosome
Biological process	spliceosomal snRNP assembly; mRNA 5'-splice site recognition; mRNA splicing, via spliceosome
Sources:Amigo / QuickGO
Orthologs
Databases	NCBI: entry; OMA: entry
Species	Human	Mouse
Entrez	6631	20630
Ensembl	ENSG00000124562	ENSMUSG00000024217
UniProt	P09234	Q62241
RefSeq (mRNA)	NM_003093	NM_011432
RefSeq (protein)	NP_003084	NP_035562
Location (UCSC)	Chr 6: 34.76 – 34.77 Mb	Chr 17: 28.06 – 28.07 Mb
PubMed search
- Wikidata
View/Edit Human	View/Edit Mouse

U1 small nuclear ribonucleoprotein C is a protein that in humans is encoded by the SNRPC gene.

== Interactions ==
Small nuclear ribonucleoprotein polypeptide C has been shown to interact with Ewing sarcoma breakpoint region 1.
