= Melvin Tefft =

American physician (1935–2003)

- Born: Boston, Massachusetts, U.S.
- Died: May 11, 2003 (aged 67)
- Medical career
- Institutions: Boston Children's Hospital; Massachusetts General Hospital
- Sub-specialties: Radiation oncology

Melvin Tefft (15 December 1932 – 11 May 2003) was an American physician who specialised in radiation oncology in children at the Boston Children's Hospital and later at the Massachusetts General Hospital. He was the first to report an extraskeletal Ewing sarcoma in 1969.

== Early life and education ==
Melvin Tefft was born on 15 December 1932, in Boston. In 1954, he received a bachelor's degree from Harvard College, and in 1958 gained a medical diploma from Boston University School of Medicine.

== Career ==
Tefft completed his internship at Boston City Hospital before taking up his residency in radiology at the Massachusetts General Hospital, where he also spent a year as a NIH fellow. Through the 1960s, at the Boston Children's Hospital, he progressed from assistant professor to chief of the division of radiology. He was influenced by Giulio D'Angio.

In 1970, he was at the Massachusetts General Hospital.

== Selected publications ==
- Tefft, M.; Vawter, G. F.; Mitus, A. (June 1969). "Paravertebral "round cell" tumors in children". Radiology. 92 (7): 1501–1509. doi:10.1148/92.7.1501. ISSN 0033-8419. PMID 5799839.
