= CD99 =

Protein-coding gene in humans

Identifiers
- Aliases: CD99, HBA71, MIC2, MIC2X, MIC2Y, MSK5X, CD99 molecule, CD99 molecule (Xg blood group)
- External IDs: OMIM: 313470, 450000; GeneCards: CD99

Gene location (Human)
Chr.	X chromosome (human)
Band	X;Y	Start	2,691,187 bp
Band	X;Y	End	2,741,309 bp
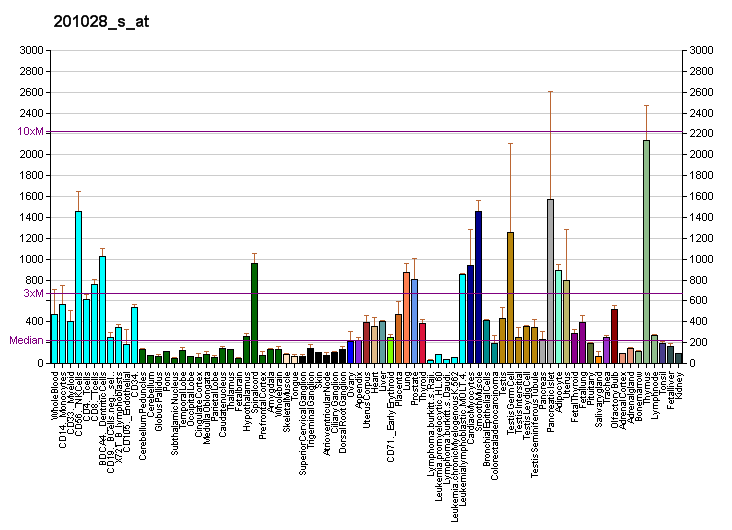

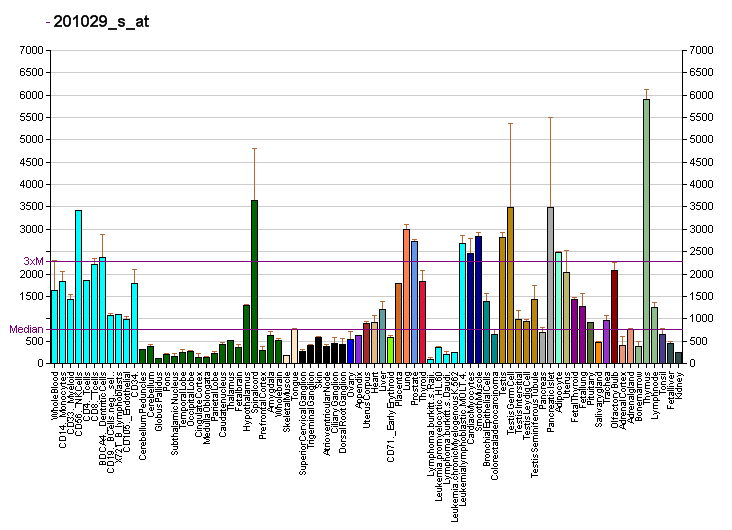
RNA expression pattern
Bgee	Human / Mouse (ortholog); Top expressed in: beta cell; thymus; synovial joint; stromal cell of endometrium; olfactory bulb; tendon of biceps brachii; synovial membrane; right coronary artery; vena cava; tibial nerve / n/a; More reference expression data
BioGPS	More reference expression data
Gene ontology
Molecular function	protein binding
Cellular component	cytoplasm; integral component of membrane; plasma membrane; integral component of plasma membrane; membrane; focal adhesion
Biological process	cell adhesion; regulation of immune response; homotypic cell-cell adhesion; T cell extravasation; positive regulation of neutrophil extravasation
Sources:Amigo / QuickGO
Orthologs
Databases	NCBI: entry; OMA: entry
Species	Human	Mouse
Entrez	4267	n/a
Ensembl	ENSG00000002586	n/a
UniProt	P14209	n/a
RefSeq (mRNA)	NM_001122898; NM_001277710; NM_002414; NM_001321367; NM_001321368 NM_001321369; NM_001321370	n/a
RefSeq (protein)	NP_001116370; NP_001308296; NP_001308297; NP_001308298; NP_001308299 NP_002405	n/a
Location (UCSC)	Chr X: 2.69 – 2.74 Mb	n/a
PubMed search		n/a
- Wikidata
View/Edit Human

CD99 antigen (Cluster of differentiation 99), also known as MIC2 or single-chain type-1 glycoprotein, is a heavily O-glycosylated transmembrane protein that is encoded by the CD99 gene in humans. The protein has a mass of 32 kD. Unusually for a gene present on the X chromosome, the CD99 gene does not undergo X inactivation, and it was the first such pseudoautosomal gene to be discovered in humans.

== Expression ==
It is expressed on all leukocytes but highest on thymocytes and is believed to augment T-cell adhesion and apoptosis of double positive T cells. It has been found in endothelial cells and in the periodontium, including gingival fibroblasts and gingival epithelial cells. It also participates in migration and activation. There is also experimental evidence that it binds to cyclophilin A.

It is found on the cell surface of Ewing's sarcoma tumors and is positive in granulosa cell tumors. It is more expressed in malignant gliomas than in the brain, and such overexpression results in higher levels of invasiveness and lower rates of survival. Antibodies to CD99 are used in diagnostic immunohistochemistry to distinguish Ewing's sarcoma from other tumours of similar histological appearance, as well as for the identification of thymic tumours, and of spindle cell tumours, such as synovial sarcoma, haemangiopericytoma, and meningioma. EWS/FLI is thought to regulate CD99, but knockdown of EWS/FLI results in only a modest reduction in CD99. When CD99 expression is knocked down in human cells with Ewing's sarcoma and those cells are grafted onto mice, tumor and bone metastasis development is reduced.

Reducing CD99 expression results in higher β-III tubulin expression and more neurite outgrowth.

Upregulating CD99 expression in the cell line L428, a Hodgkin's lymphoma line, resulted in those cells redifferentiating towards B cells. Consequently, the loss of B-cell differentiation in Hodgkin's lymphoma may be due to CD99 downregulation.

Men appear to express higher levels of CD99 than women.

== Prognostic Value ==
In patients with diffuse large B-cell lymphoma (DLBCL) with the germinal center B-cell (GCB, classified according to the Muris algorithm) subtype, positive expression of CD99 resulted in better 2-year event free survival (EFS) and 2-year overall survival (OS) compared to negative expression of CD99. In patients with DLBCL with non-GCB, however, negative expression of CD99 resulted in better 2-year EFS and 2-year OS. In patients with non-small cell lung cancer (NSCLC), higher CD99 expression in the stroma results in better prognosis.

== Interactions ==
There is evidence that through suppressing β1 integrin affinity, CD99 inhibits cell-extracellular matrix adhesion.
