= ZNF217 =

Protein-coding gene in the species Homo sapiens

Identifiers
- Aliases: ZNF217, ZABC1, zinc finger protein 217
- External IDs: OMIM: 602967; MGI: 2685408; GeneCards: ZNF217
Available structures
PDB	Ortholog search: PDBe RCSB
PDB	List of PDB id codes 2HU2, 3UK3, 4F2J, 4IS1

Gene location (Human)
Chr.	Chromosome 20 (human)
Band	20q13.2	Start	53,567,071 bp
Band	20q13.2	End	53,609,907 bp

Gene location (Mouse)
Chr.	Chromosome 2 (mouse)
Band	2 H3|2 89.91 cM	Start	169,950,563 bp
Band	2 H3|2 89.91 cM	End	169,990,023 bp
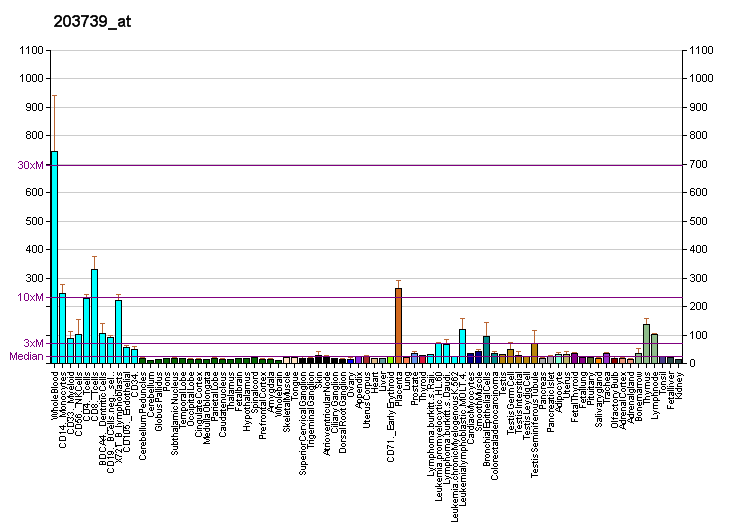
RNA expression pattern
Bgee	Human / Mouse (ortholog); Top expressed in: germinal epithelium; palpebral conjunctiva; buccal mucosa cell; epithelium of nasopharynx; white blood cell; monocyte; mucosa of sigmoid colon; cartilage tissue; tonsil; lactiferous duct / Top expressed in: granulocyte; spermatid; medullary collecting duct; renal corpuscle; Gonadal ridge; primitive streak; conjunctival fornix; bone marrow; otolith organ; lymph node; More reference expression data
BioGPS	More reference expression data
Gene ontology
Molecular function	DNA-binding transcription factor activity; RNA polymerase II cis-regulatory region sequence-specific DNA binding; DNA binding; DNA-binding transcription repressor activity, RNA polymerase II-specific; protein binding; metal ion binding; nucleic acid binding; DNA-binding transcription factor activity, RNA polymerase II-specific
Cellular component	histone deacetylase complex; nucleus; mitochondrion; nuclear speck; nucleoplasm
Biological process	negative regulation of transcription, DNA-templated; regulation of transcription, DNA-templated; negative regulation of transcription by RNA polymerase II; transcription, DNA-templated; signal transduction; multicellular organism development
Sources:Amigo / QuickGO
Orthologs
Databases	NCBI: entry; OMA: entry
Species	Human	Mouse
Entrez	7764	228913
Ensembl	ENSG00000171940	ENSMUSG00000052056
UniProt	O75362	Q3U0X6
RefSeq (mRNA)	NM_006526; NM_001385034	NM_001033299; NM_001159683
RefSeq (protein)	NP_006517	NP_001028471; NP_001153155
Location (UCSC)	Chr 20: 53.57 – 53.61 Mb	Chr 2: 169.95 – 169.99 Mb
PubMed search
- Wikidata
View/Edit Human	View/Edit Mouse

Zinc finger protein 217, also known as ZNF217, is a protein which in humans is encoded by the ZNF217 gene.

== Function ==
ZNF217 can attenuate apoptotic signals resulting from telomere dysfunction and may promote neoplastic transformation and later stages of malignancy. Znf217 was shown to be a prognostic biomarker and therapeutic target during breast cancer progression.

== See also ==
- Zinc finger
