= RNA-binding protein EWS =

Human protein and coding gene

EWSR1
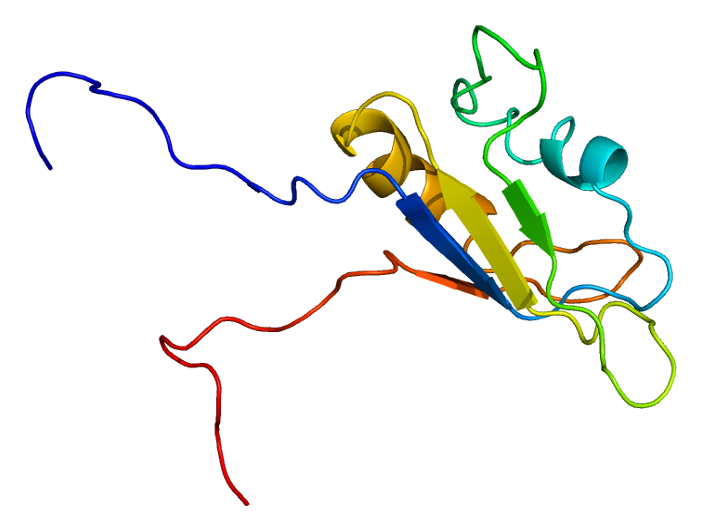

Identifiers
- Aliases: EWSR1, EWS, bK984G1.4, EWS-FLI1, Ewing sarcoma breakpoint region 1, EWS RNA binding protein 1, RNA-binding protein EWS, IPR033109
- External IDs: OMIM: 133450; MGI: 99960; GeneCards: EWSR1
Available structures
PDB	Ortholog search: PDBe RCSB
PDB	List of PDB id codes 2CPE

Gene location (Human)
Chr.	Chromosome 22 (human)
Band	22q12.2	Start	29,268,009 bp
Band	22q12.2	End	29,300,525 bp

Gene location (Mouse)
Chr.	Chromosome 11 (mouse)
Band	11|11 A1	Start	5,069,689 bp
Band	11|11 A1	End	5,099,266 bp
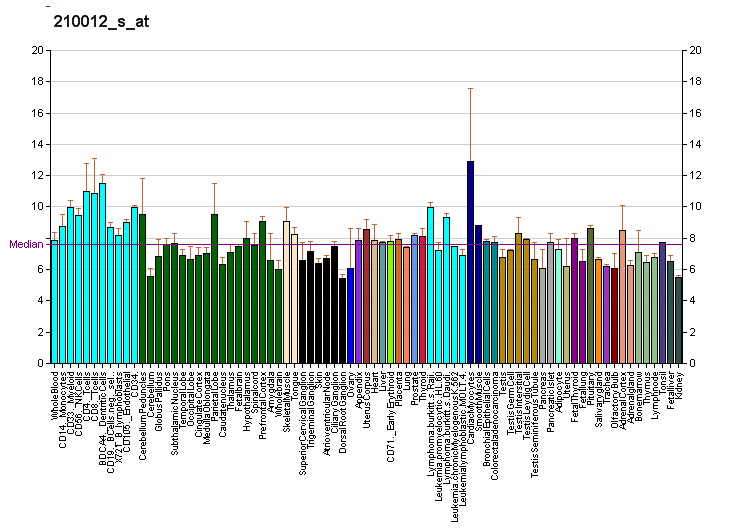
RNA expression pattern
Bgee	Human / Mouse (ortholog); Top expressed in: right uterine tube; left testis; right testis; right hemisphere of cerebellum; right lobe of thyroid gland; right adrenal cortex; left adrenal cortex; ganglionic eminence; body of uterus; left lobe of thyroid gland / Top expressed in: yolk sac; neural layer of retina; ventricular zone; genital tubercle; tail of embryo; superior frontal gyrus; primary visual cortex; spermatocyte; spermatid; lip; More reference expression data
BioGPS	More reference expression data
Gene ontology
Molecular function	metal ion binding; protein binding; calmodulin binding; identical protein binding; nucleic acid binding; RNA binding
Cellular component	cytoplasm; plasma membrane; nucleolus; membrane; nucleus
Biological process	regulation of transcription, DNA-templated; transcription, DNA-templated
Sources:Amigo / QuickGO
Orthologs
Databases	NCBI: entry; OMA: entry
Species	Human	Mouse
Entrez	2130	14030
Ensembl	ENSG00000182944	ENSMUSG00000009079
UniProt	Q01844	Q61545
RefSeq (mRNA)	NM_001163285; NM_001163286; NM_001163287; NM_005243; NM_013986	NM_001283061; NM_001283062; NM_001283063; NM_007968
RefSeq (protein)	NP_001156757; NP_001156758; NP_001156759; NP_005234; NP_053733	NP_001269990; NP_001269991; NP_001269992; NP_031994; NP_001349541 NP_001349542; NP_001349543; NP_001349544; NP_001349545; NP_001349546; NP_001349547; NP_001349549
Location (UCSC)	Chr 22: 29.27 – 29.3 Mb	Chr 11: 5.07 – 5.1 Mb
PubMed search
- Wikidata
View/Edit Human	View/Edit Mouse

RNA-binding protein EWS is a protein that in humans is encoded by the EWSR1 gene on human chromosome 22, specifically 22q12.2. It is one of 3 proteins in the FET protein family.

== Clinical significance ==
The q22.2 region of chromosome 22 encodes the N-terminal transactivation domain of the EWS protein and that region may become joined to one of several other chromosomes which encode various transcription factors; see EWS/FLI and OMIM-133450. The expression of a chimeric protein with the EWS transactivation domain fused to the DNA binding region of a transcription factor generates a powerful oncogenic protein causing Ewing sarcoma and other members of the Ewing family of tumors. These translocations can occur due to chromoplexy, a burst of complex chromosomal rearrangements seen in cancer cells. The normal EWS gene encodes an RNA binding protein closely related to FUS (gene) and TAF15, all of which have been associated to amyotrophic lateral sclerosis.

== Interactions ==
The EWS protein has been shown to interact with:

- ATF1,
- BARD1,
- ERG,
- POU4F1,
- PTK2B
- SF1,
- SNRPC, and
- ZNF165.
