= FLI1 =

Protein-coding gene in the species Homo sapiens

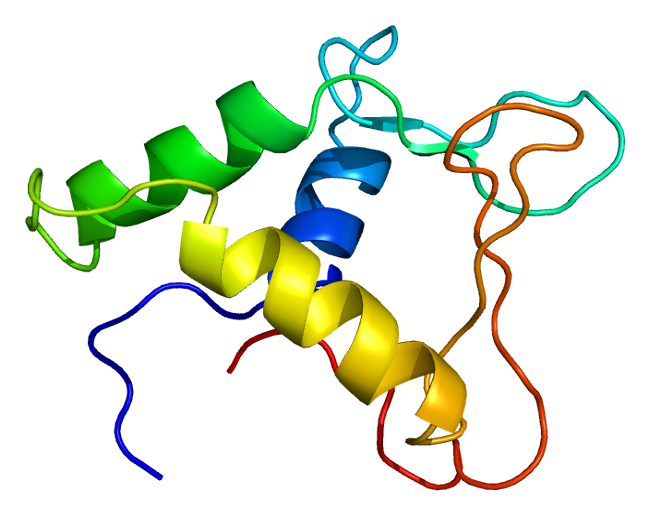

Identifiers
- Aliases: FLI1, EWSR2, SIC-1, Fli-1 proto-oncogene, ETS transcription factor, BDPLT21, FLI-1
- External IDs: OMIM: 193067; MGI: 95554; GeneCards: FLI1
Available structures
PDB	Ortholog search: PDBe RCSB
PDB	List of PDB id codes 1FLI, 1X66, 2YTU, 5E8G, 5E8I

Gene location (Human)
Chr.	Chromosome 11 (human)
Band	11q24.3	Start	128,686,535 bp
Band	11q24.3	End	128,813,267 bp

Gene location (Mouse)
Chr.	Chromosome 9 (mouse)
Band	9 A4|9 17.74 cM	Start	32,333,500 bp
Band	9 A4|9 17.74 cM	End	32,454,157 bp
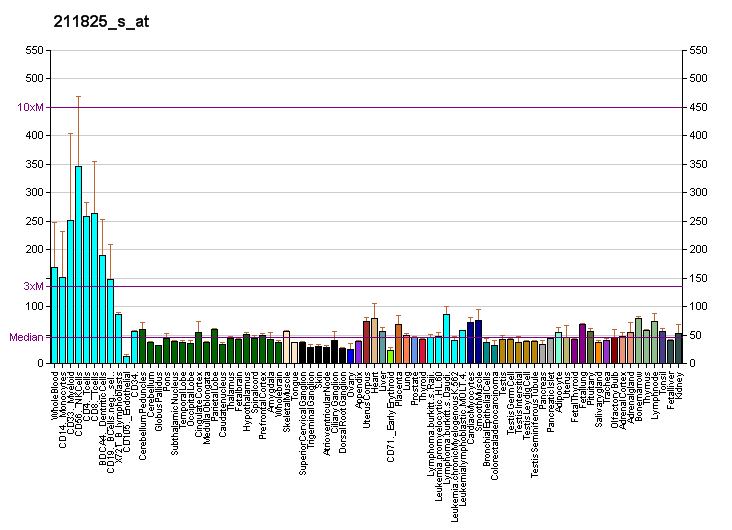

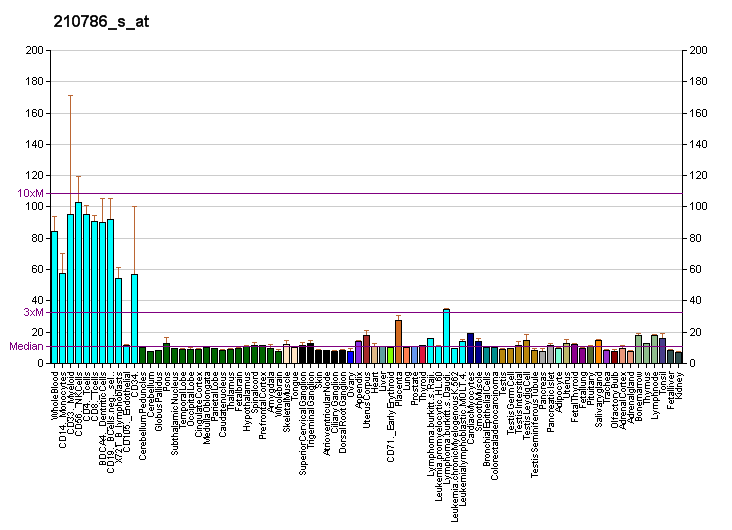

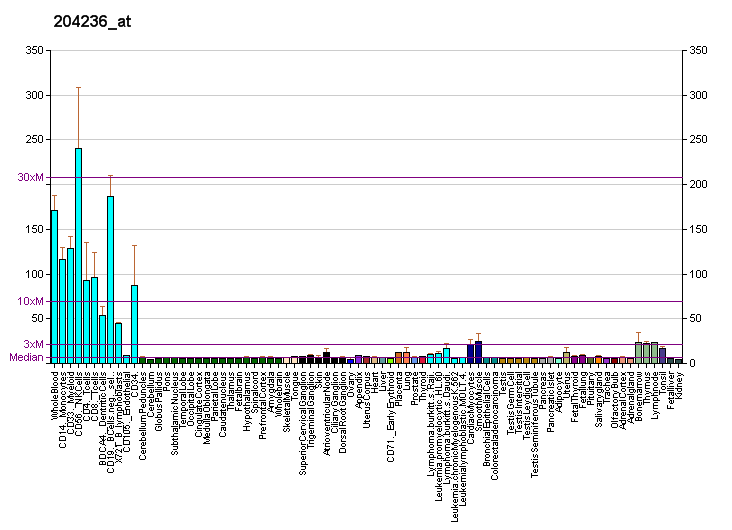
RNA expression pattern
Bgee	Human / Mouse (ortholog); Top expressed in: monocyte; granulocyte; blood; spleen; bone marrow cell; trabecular bone; appendix; lymph node; right lung; upper lobe of left lung / Top expressed in: dermis; tibiofemoral joint; spleen; left lung lobe; mesenteric lymph nodes; granulocyte; blood; genital tubercle; abdominal wall; stroma of bone marrow; More reference expression data
BioGPS	More reference expression data
Gene ontology
Molecular function	protein binding; RNA polymerase II cis-regulatory region sequence-specific DNA binding; chromatin binding; sequence-specific DNA binding; DNA-binding transcription factor activity; DNA binding; DNA-binding transcription activator activity, RNA polymerase II-specific; DNA-binding transcription factor activity, RNA polymerase II-specific
Cellular component	nucleus; cytosol; nuclear body
Biological process	megakaryocyte development; positive regulation of transcription by RNA polymerase II; transcription by RNA polymerase II; hemostasis; regulation of transcription, DNA-templated; regulation of transcription by RNA polymerase II; cell differentiation; animal organ morphogenesis; blood circulation; transcription, DNA-templated; positive regulation of transcription, DNA-templated
Sources:Amigo / QuickGO
Orthologs
Databases	NCBI: entry; OMA: entry
Species	Human	Mouse
Entrez	2313	14247
Ensembl	ENSG00000151702	ENSMUSG00000016087
UniProt	Q01543	P26323
RefSeq (mRNA)	NM_001167681; NM_001271010; NM_001271012; NM_002017	NM_008026
RefSeq (protein)	NP_001161153; NP_001257939; NP_001257941; NP_002008; NP_001161153.1	NP_032052
Location (UCSC)	Chr 11: 128.69 – 128.81 Mb	Chr 9: 32.33 – 32.45 Mb
PubMed search
- Wikidata
View/Edit Human	View/Edit Mouse

Friend leukemia integration 1 transcription factor (FLI1), also known as transcription factor ERGB, is a protein that in humans is encoded by the FLI1 gene, which is a proto-oncogene. Germline pathogenic variants in FLI1 can cause inherited thrombocytopenia associated with platelet dysfunction and an increased bleeding tendency.

== Function ==
Fli-1 is a member of the ETS transcription factor family that was first identified in erythroleukemias induced by Friend Murine Leukemia Virus (F-MuLV). Fli-1 is activated through retroviral insertional mutagenesis in 90% of F-MuLV-induced erythroleukemias. The constitutive activation of fli-1 in erythroblasts leads to a dramatic shift in the Epo/Epo-R signal transduction pathway, blocking erythroid differentiation, activating the Ras pathway, and resulting in massive Epo-independent proliferation of erythroblasts. These results suggest that Fli-1 overexpression in erythroblasts alters their responsiveness to Epo and triggers abnormal proliferation by switching the signaling event(s) associated with terminal differentiation to proliferation.

== Clinical significance ==
In addition to Friend erythroleukemia, proviral integration at the fli-1 locus also occurs in leukemias induced by the 10A1, Graffi, and Cas-Br-E viruses. Fli-1 aberrant expression is also associated with chromosomal abnormalities in humans. In pediatric Ewing's sarcoma a chromosomal translocation generates a fusion of the 5' transactivation domain of EWSR1 (also known as EWS) with the 3' Ets domain of Fli-1. The resulting fusion oncoprotein, EWS/Fli-1, acts as an aberrant transcriptional activator. with strong transforming capabilities. EWS/Fli-1 may steer clinically important genes via interaction with enhancer-like GGAA-microsatellites. The importance of Fli-1 in the development of human leukemia, such as acute myelogenous leukemia (AML), has been demonstrated in studies of translocation involving the Tel transcription factor, which interacts with Fli-1 through protein-protein interactions. A recent study has demonstrated high levels of Fli-1 expression in several benign and malignant neoplasms using immunohistochemistry.

A possible association with Paris-Trousseau syndrome has been suggested.
