= Ewing family of tumors =

Group of cancers

The Ewing family of tumors (EFTs) is a group of small cell sarcomas including Ewing sarcoma of the bone, extra osseous Ewing tumors, and primitive neuroectodermal tumors. They are rare cancers, usually diagnosed in peoples' twenties. The sarcoma of bone is the most common of the variants. All forms are predisposed to metastasis and have had historically high rates of mortality. The family of tumors shares a common translocation mutation of the EWS gene on chromosome 22 to an ETS-type gene, most commonly the FLI1 gene. EFTs are highly malignant, with 5-year survival for patients with metastatic disease at 20%. The current standard of care includes resection, radiation, and chemotherapy.

== Genetic and demographic predisposition ==
Ewing's sarcoma is most common in Caucasians and typically diagnosed during the first several decades of life, most often in someone's teens. The cancer also affects males at twice the rate compared to females.

Despite EFTs appearing more often in younger patients, they have not been linked to any common cancer predisposing syndromes, such as Li-Fraumeni Syndrome. EFTs have also not been shown to correlate with any environmental risk factor. The defining genetic mutation of EFTs is the translocation of EWS gene located on chromosome 22 to an ETS-type gene, most often FLI1. Other potential fusion genes include ERG, ETV1, E1A-F, or FEV.

== Types ==
The Ewing Family of Tumors are small cell sarcomas most commonly occurring within the bone, but may also occur within soft tissues or as a primitive neuroendocrine tumor.

=== Ewing's sarcoma of bone ===
Ewing's sarcoma of bone is the most common of the EFTs and tends to occur in the trunk and long bones. The cancer most often occurs in the shaft, or diaphysis, of bones, as compared to other common bone cancers. The most common presenting symptom is pain in the bone, and the initial diagnostic step is imaging, often both MRI and radiograph. Due to the high chance of metastasis, full body PET/CT is often performed to look for cancer spread. Confirming diagnosis of Ewing's sarcoma requires biopsy and genetic testing. The current practice for treatment is first neoadjuvant radiation to shrink the cancer, resection, and follow up chemotherapy.

=== Extra-osseous Ewing's sarcoma ===
Extra-osseous Ewing's sarcoma accounts for roughly 20% of Ewing's sarcoma cases, and most commonly occurs in the glutes, shoulders, and arms. The presentation is nonspecific, with most patients first reporting a painful mass. Initial workup is similar to Ewing's sarcoma of bone, beginning with imaging. However, ultrasound is often used in conjunction with CT and MRI. Biopsy is again required to confirm diagnosis. Treatment also consists of surgical removal followed by chemotherapy, however patients seem to do better overall when compared to Ewing's sarcoma of the bone.

=== Primitive Neuroectodermal Tumor (PNETs) ===
Primitive neuroendocrine tumors are rare forms of EFTs that originate from neuroendocrine cells, with the differentiation varying from tumor to tumor. PNETs were first discovered in peripheral nerves and considered distinct from EFTs, until genetic studies showed the same translocation of EWS-FLI1 in PNETs. PNETs and Ewing's sarcoma are described as appearing on the same histologic spectrum. Treatment of PNETs is the same as extra-osseous Ewing's sarcoma, with resection of the whole tumor alongside chemotherapy and radiation. Outcomes however are poor as PNET remains an aggressive cancer as a member of the Ewing Family of Tumors.
