= Charcot–Marie–Tooth disease classifications =

Peripheral nervous system disorders

Classifications of Charcot–Marie–Tooth disease refers to the types and subtypes of Charcot–Marie–Tooth disease (CMT), a genetically and clinically heterogeneous group of inherited disorders of the peripheral nervous system characterized by progressive loss of muscle tissue and touch sensation across various parts of the body. CMT is a result of genetic mutations in a number of genes.

== Clinical categories ==
Type	Name	Incidence	Notes
CMT1	Demyelinating type	Affects approximately 30% of CMT patients	Causes severe demyelination, thereby impairing nerve conduction velocity.
CMT2	Axonal type	Affects approximately 20–40% of CMT patients	Mainly affects axons. Tends to affect lower extremities more than upper extremities. Clinical symptoms are often less severe than in CMT1. As it is an axonopathy, average nerve conduction velocity is usually not affected (sometimes slightly below normal but mostly above 38 m/s).
CMT3	Dejerine–Sottas disease	Very rare	Severely impaired nerve conduction velocity.
CMT4	Spinal type		
CMT5	Pyramidal type		
CMT6	With optic atrophy		
CMTDI	Dominant intermediate type		
CMTRI	Recessive intermediate type		
CMTX	X-linked type	Affects approximately 10–20% of CMT patients	This type encompasses all CMT forms that are inherited in an X-linked manner. Average NCV: 25–40 m/s.

== Genetic subtypes ==
Type	Subtype	OMIM	Gene	Locus	Inheritance	Notes
CMT1	CMT1A	118220	PMP22	17p11.2	Autosomal dominant	The most common form of the disease, 70–80% of Type 1 patients. Average NCV: 20–25 m/s. Allelic with subtype CMT1E. When associated with subtype CMT1B (causing essential tremor and ataxia), it is called Roussy–Lévy syndrome.
CMT1	CMT1B	118200	MPZ	1q23.3	Autosomal dominant	Responsible for 5–10% of Type 1 patients. Average NCV: < 15 m/s
CMT1	CMT1C	601098	LITAF	16p13.13	Autosomal dominant	Usually shows up in infancy. Average NCV: 26–42 m/s. Symptoms are identical to CMT1A.
CMT1	CMT1D	607678	EGR2	10q21.3	Autosomal dominant	Average NCV: 15–20 m/s
CMT1	CMT1E	118300	PMP22	17p11.2	Autosomal dominant	Characterised by demyelination and loss of hearing; allelic with subtype CMT1A
CMT1	CMT1F	607734	NEFL	8p21.2	Autosomal dominant	
CMT1	CMT1G	618279	PMP2	8q21.13	Autosomal dominant	
CMT2	CMT2A1	118210	KIF1B	1p36.22	Autosomal dominant	
CMT2	CMT2A2A	609260	MFN2	1p36.22	Autosomal dominant	
CMT2	CMT2A2B	617087	MFN2	1p36.22	Autosomal recessive	
CMT2	CMT2B	600882	RAB7A; RAB7B	3q21.3	Autosomal dominant	
CMT2	CMT2B1	605588	LMNA	1q22	Autosomal recessive	A laminopathy
CMT2	CMT2B2	605589	PNKP	19q13.33	Autosomal dominant	
CMT2	CMT2C	606071	TRPV4	12q24.11	Autosomal dominant	May cause vocal cord, diaphragm, and distal weakness
CMT2	CMT2D	601472	GARS	7p14.3	Autosomal dominant	Symptoms are more severe in the upper extremities (hands), which is atypical for CMT
CMT2	CMT2E	607684	NEFL	8p21.2	Autosomal dominant	
CMT2	CMT2F	606595	HSPB1	7q11.23	Autosomal dominant	
CMT2	CMT2H	607731	GDAP1	8q21.11	Autosomal dominant	Allelic with subtype CMT2K
CMT2	CMT2I	607677	MPZ	1q23.3	Autosomal dominant	Allelic with subtype CMT2J and forms of CMT3
CMT2	CMT2J	607736	MPZ	1q23.3	Autosomal dominant	Allelic with subtype CMT2I and forms of CMT3
CMT2	CMT2K	607831	GDAP1	8q21.11	Autosomal dominant	Allelic with subtype CMT2H
CMT2	CMT2L	608673	HSPB8	12q24.23	Autosomal dominant	Allelic with Autosomal dominant distal spinal muscular atrophy
CMT2	CMT2M	606482	DNM2	19p13.2	Autosomal dominant	Full name: CMT2M, included; more commonly classified as subtype CMTDIB
CMT2	CMT2N	613287	AARS	16q22.1	Autosomal dominant	
CMT2	CMT2O	614228	DYNC1H1	14q32.31	Autosomal dominant	Allelic with spinal muscular atrophy with lower extremity predominance 1
CMT2	CMT2P	614436	LRSAM1	9q33.3	Autosomal dominant Autosomal recessive	Juvenile or adult onset, slowly progressive
CMT2	CMT2Q	615025	DHTKD1	10p14	Autosomal dominant	
CMT2	CMT2R	615490	TRIM2	4q31.3	Autosomal recessive	
CMT2	CMT2S	616155	IGHMBP2	11q13.3	Autosomal recessive	
CMT2	CMT2T	617017	MME	3q25	Autosomal recessive	
CMT2	CMT2U	616280	MARS	12q13.3	Autosomal dominant	
CMT2	CMT2V	616491	NAGLU	17q21.2	Autosomal dominant	
CMT2	CMT2W	616625	HARS1	5q31.3	Autosomal dominant	
CMT2	CMT2X	616668	SPG11	15q21.1	Autosomal recessive	
CMT2	CMT2Y	616687	VCP	9p13.3	Autosomal dominant	
CMT2	CMT2Z	616688	MORC2	22q12.2	Autosomal dominant	
CMT2	CMT2CC	616924	NEFH	22q12.2	Autosomal dominant	
CMT2	CMT2DD	618036	ATP1A1	1p13.1	Autosomal dominant	
CMT2	CMT2EE	618400	MPV17	2p23.3	Autosomal recessive	
CMT3	CMT3	145900	MPZ; EGR2; PMP22; PRX	1q23.3 10q21.3 17p12 19q13.2	Autosomal dominant Autosomal recessive	More commonly known as Dejerine–Sottas disease; subtype CMT4F sometimes included here
CMT4	CMT4A	214400	GDAP1	8q21.11	Autosomal recessive	Allelic with subtype CMTRIA
CMT4	CMT4B1	601382	MTMR2	11q21	Autosomal recessive	
CMT4	CMT4B2	604563	SBF2	11p15.4	Autosomal recessive	
CMT4	CMT4B3	615284	SBF1	22q13.33	Autosomal recessive	
CMT4	CMT4C	601596	SH3TC2	5q32	Autosomal recessive	May lead to respiratory compromise
CMT4	CMT4D	601455	NDRG1	8q24.3	Autosomal recessive	Characterised by demyelination and loss of hearing
CMT4	CMT4E	605253	MPZ; EGR2	1q23.3 10q21.3	Autosomal recessive	Also known as congenital hypomyelinating neuropathy; phenotype largely overlapping with subtype CMT4F
CMT4	CMT4F	145900	PRX	19q13.2	Autosomal recessive	Phenotype largely overlapping with subtype CMT4E; may be the same as CMT3
CMT4	CMT4G	605285	HK1	10q22.1	Autosomal recessive	Also known as Russe-type hereditary motor and sensory neuropathy (HMSNR); second most common cause of CMT in the Spanish Roma population
CMT4	CMT4H	609311	FGD4	12p11.21	Autosomal recessive	
CMT4	CMT4J	611228	FIG4	6q21	Autosomal recessive	Allelic to amyotrophic lateral sclerosis type 11
CMT5	CMT5	600361	?	4q34.3–q35.2	Autosomal dominant	Also known as CMT with pyramidal features; onset in 2nd decade of life with distal muscle wasting, particularly in legs
CMT6	CMT6A	601152	MFN2	1p36.22	Autosomal dominant	Characterised by optic atrophy, hence known also as CMT with optic atrophy. Also known as hereditary motor and sensory neuropathy type VI.
CMT6	CMT6B	616505	SLC25A46	5q22.1	Autosomal recessive	Characterised by optic atrophy, hence known also as CMT with optic atrophy. Also known as hereditary motor and sensory neuropathy type VI.
CMT6	CMT6C	618511	PDXK	21q22.3	Autosomal recessive	Characterised by optic atrophy, hence known also as CMT with optic atrophy. Also known as hereditary motor and sensory neuropathy type VI.
CMTDI	CMTDIA	620378	?	10q24.1–q25.1	Autosomal dominant	
CMTDI	CMTDIB	606482	DNM2	19p13.2	Autosomal dominant	Also classified as subtype CMT2M
CMTDI	CMTDIC	608323	YARS	1p35.1	Autosomal dominant	
CMTDI	CMTDID	607791	MPZ	1q23.3	Autosomal dominant	
CMTDI	CMTDIE	614455	INF2	14q32.33	Autosomal dominant	
CMTDI	CMTDIF	615185	GNB4	3q26.33	Autosomal dominant	
CMTRI	CMTRIA	608340	GDAP1	8q21.11	Autosomal recessive	Allelic with subtype CMT4A
CMTRI	CMTRIB	613641	KARS	16q23.1	Autosomal recessive	
CMTX	CMTX1	302800	GJB1	Xq13.1	X-linked dominant	Responsible for approximately 90% of CMTX patients; some studies put this number significantly higher. Note that different mutations of GJB1 may produce markedly different forms of Charcot–Marie–Tooth disease.
CMTX	CMTX2	302801	CMTX2	Xq22.2	X-linked recessive	
CMTX	CMTX3	302802	CMTX3	Xq26	X-linked recessive	
CMTX	CMTX4	310490	AIFM1	Xq24–q26.1	X-linked recessive	Also known as Cowchock syndrome
CMTX	CMTX5	311070	PRPS1	Xq22.3	X-linked recessive	Also known as Rosenberg–Chutorian syndrome; signs include optic atrophy, polyneuropathy and deafness
CMTX	CMTX6	300905	PDK3	Xp22.11	X-linked dominant	
Type	Subtype	OMIM	Gene	Locus	Inheritance	Notes

It has to be kept in mind that sometimes a particular patient diagnosed with CMT can exhibit a combination of any of the above gene mutations; thus, in these cases precise classification can be arbitrary.
