= Hereditary neuropathy with liability to pressure palsy =

- Other names: Tomaculous neuropathy
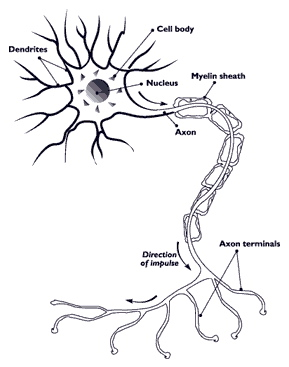
- Nerve with myelin sheath
- Specialty: Neurology
- Causes: Genetic (autosomal dominant PMP22 deletion)
- Diagnostic method: Family history, Electrophysiologic testing
- Treatment: Occupational therapist, ankle/wrist supports

Hereditary neuropathy with liability to pressure palsy (HNPP) is a peripheral neuropathy, a condition that affects the nerves. Pressure on the nerves can cause tingling sensations, numbness, pain, weakness, muscle atrophy and even paralysis of the affected area. In normal individuals, these symptoms disappear quickly, but in sufferers of HNPP even a short period of pressure can cause the symptoms to occur. Palsies can last from minutes or days to weeks or even months.

HNPP is caused by a mutation in the gene PMP22, which makes peripheral myelin protein 22. This protein has a role in the maintenance of the myelin sheath that insulates nerves, resulting in insufficient conductivity in the nerves. HNPP is part of the group of hereditary motor and sensory neuropathy (HMSN) disorders and is linked to Charcot–Marie–Tooth disease (CMT).

== Signs and symptoms ==
Symptoms and symptom onset vary; some individuals are diagnosed in childhood, others in adulthood, some report minor problems, whilst others experience severe discomfort and disability. In many cases, symptoms are mild enough to go unnoticed. The time period between episodes is known to vary between individuals. HNPP has not been found to alter the lifespan, although in some cases a decline in quality of life is noticed. Some sufferers (10–15%) report various pains growing in severity with progression of the disease. The nerves most commonly affected are the peroneal nerve at the fibular head (leg and feet), the ulnar nerve at the elbow (arm) and the median nerve at the wrist (palm, thumbs and fingers), but any peripheral nerve can be affected. Among the signs/symptoms are the following (different symptoms are caused by different nerves, such as the foot drop caused by the peroneal nerve): Other HNPP symptoms can include: Partial hearing loss and facial numbness (cranial nerves can be afflicted by HNPP), intolerable fatigue and pain, sensation loss and muscle weakness in the hands and feet. There is a wide range in the severity of these symptoms

- Pes cavus (less frequent)
- Muscle weakness
- Foot drop
- Numbness in fingers
- Arm weakness
- Intolerable fatigue and pain

== Causes ==
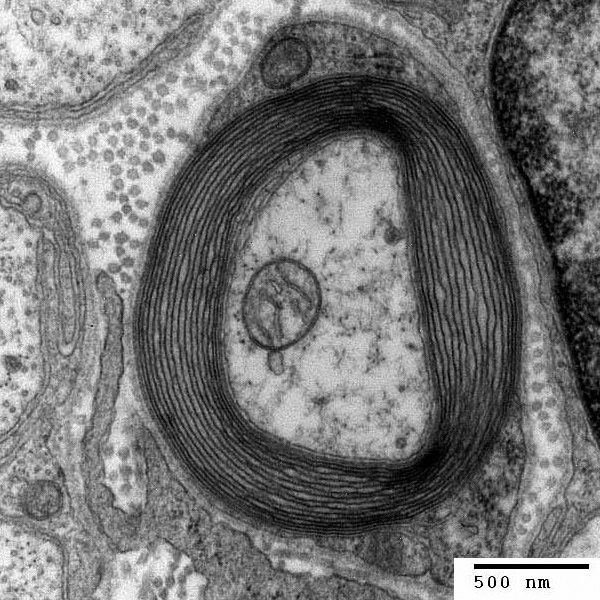
Myelinated neuron

HNPP is typically caused by autosomal dominant deletion of PMP22 (peripheral myelin protein 22 at locus 17p11.2). PMP22 displays haploinsufficiency, such that the normal copy of the gene's activity is insufficient to compensate for loss of function of the affected copy. PMP22 point mutations, such as the frameshift mutation Gly94fsX222 (c.281_282insG), can cause clinical overlap between PNPP and Charcot–Marie–Tooth disease type 1A. Missense, nonsense, and splice site mutations have been described.PMP22 encodes a 22-kD protein that comprises 2 to 5% of peripheral nervous system myelin. It is involved in maintaining the myelin sheath that surrounds peripheral nerves to facilitate conductivity.

== Diagnosis ==
Diagnosis of HNPP is established via genetic testing. The diagnosis should be suspected in individuals who display the clinical syndrome, display abnormal nerve conduction study findings, and have known family history of HNPP.

== Treatment ==
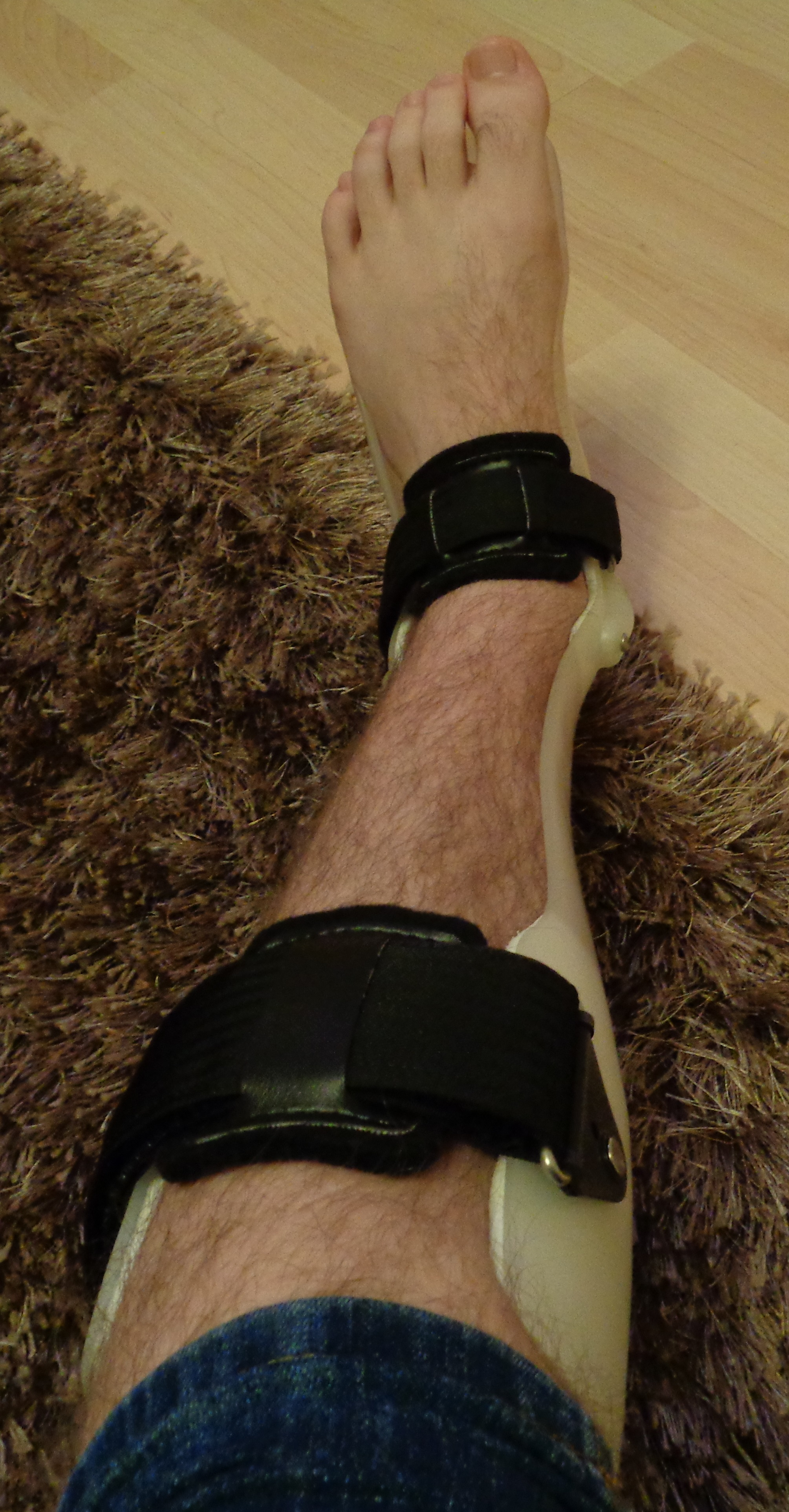
Ankle foot orthosis

There is no current treatment, however management of HNPP can be done via:

- Physical therapist
- Occupational therapist
- Ankle/foot orthosis
- Wrist splint
- Avoid repetitive movements

== Epidemiology ==
HNPP is a rare disorder. Partly because it is so rare and partly because many people who have it only experience mild symptoms, it is difficult to tell what percentage of people have it. One range of estimates is from one in 50,000 up to about one in 33,333. Another is from one in 119,049 up to one in 6,250. In a study of newborns in Korea who all got a genetic test for the disorder, around one in 1,698 of the newborns had it.

== History ==
Inherited peripheral nervous system disorders were first described by Charcot, Marie and Tooth (1886). De Jong (1947) first described HNPP in a Dutch family. Dyck and Lambert (1968) showed nerve conduction studies, and Chance et al. (1993) detected the chromosome deletion in most of the individuals with the HNPP condition.

== See also ==
- Hereditary motor and sensory neuropathy
