= Pierre Marie =

French neurologist (1853–1940)

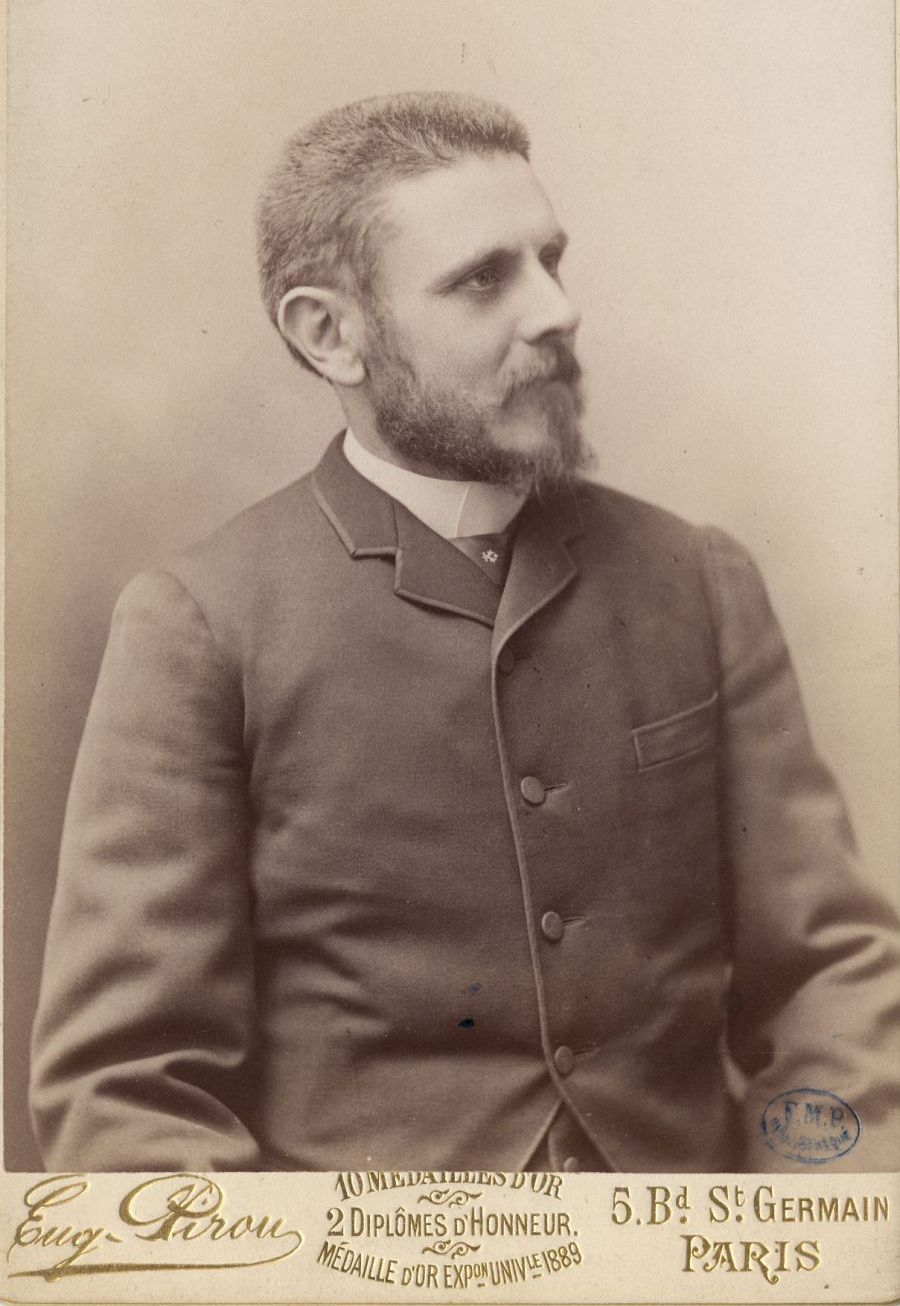
- Pierre Marie
- Born: 9 September 1853; Paris, France
- Died: 13 April 1940 (aged 86)
- Known for: acromegaly, Charcot–Marie–Tooth disease, physical culture
- Scientific career
- Fields: Neurology; Endocrinology
- Workplaces: Salpêtrière; SFIO

Pierre Marie (9 September 1853 – 13 April 1940) was a French neurologist and political journalist close to the SFIO.

== Medical career ==
After finishing medical school, he served as an interne (1878), working as an assistant to neurologist Jean-Martin Charcot (1825–1893) at the Salpêtrière and Bicêtre Hospitals in Paris. In 1883, he received his medical doctorate with a graduate thesis on Basedow’s disease, being promoted to médecin des hôpitaux several years later (1888). In 1907, he attained the chair of pathological anatomy at the Faculty of Medicine, and in 1917 was appointed to the chair of neurology, a position he held until 1925. In 1911, Marie became a member of the Académie de Médecine.

One of Marie's earlier contributions was a description of a disorder of the pituitary gland known as acromegaly. His analysis of the disease was an important contribution to the emerging field of endocrinology. Marie is also credited as the first to describe pulmonary hypertrophic osteoarthropathy, cleidocranial dysostosis and rhizomelic spondylosis. In his extensive research on aphasia, his views concerning language disorders sharply contrasted with the generally accepted views of Paul Broca (1824–1880). In 1907, he was the first person to describe the speech production disorder of foreign accent syndrome.

Marie was the first general secretary of the Société Française de Neurologie, and with Édouard Brissaud (1852–1909), he was co-founder of the journal Revue neurologique. His name is associated with the eponymous Charcot–Marie–Tooth disease, being named along with Jean-Martin Charcot and Howard Henry Tooth (1856–1925). This disease is characterized by gradual progressive loss of distal muscle tissue in the arms and feet. It is considered the most common disease within a group of conditions known as "hereditary motor and sensory neuropathies" (HMSN).

Among the doctors trained by Pierre Marie at the beginning of the 20th century account the Spanish neuropathologists Nicolás Achúcarro and Gonzalo Rodríguez Lafora, two distinguished disciples of Santiago Ramón y Cajal and members of the Spanish Neurological School.

== Political career ==
In 1928, Marie left the medical academy to become a political journalist, first at the physical-culturist magazine La Culture physique, where Edmond Desbonnet served as his intellectual patron. His writings largely centred around his recommendations for exercise and fitness regimes, and his commentary on government sports and leisure policy.

In 1930, he turned to explicitly political writing as he moved to the Socialist Party's daily newspaper, Le Populaire. He became increasingly involved in the SFIO in the 1930s, gaining a reputation as the Party's foremost intellectual on matters of sports, leisure, and physical culture. His 1934 pamphlet, "Pour Le Sport Ouvrier", was adopted by the SFIO's Congress as official Party policy. This marked the first time the SFIO embraced physical culture explicitly. After the election of the French Popular Front in 1936, he worked in the ministerial cabinet of Léo Lagrange as a technical advisor, where he became a noted advocate of working-class sports and social hygiene within the French government. He is a rare figure to bridge the gap between French physical culturism and Socialism. After the fall of the Popular Front, Marie continued to write for Le Populaire.

Historians have disagreed about the date of Marie's death. While most medical sources place his death before Occupation, noted historian Pascal Ory recently uncovered traces of Marie's writing in collaborationist newspapers Le Rouge et Le Bleu in support of the Vichy regime until 1941. His collaborationism has led some historians to understand the influence of physical culture in the SFIO and the Vichy Regime as one path that led many Socialists - like Marie - to supporting Pétain.

== Associated eponyms ==
- "Marie's ataxia": an hereditary disease of the nervous system, with cerebellar ataxia.
- "Marie-Foix-Alajouanine syndrome": cerebellar ataxia of the cerebellum in the elderly; usually due to alcohol abuse. Named along with neurologists Théophile Alajouanine (1890–1980) and Charles Foix (1882–1927).
- "Marie's anarthria": inability to articulate words due to cerebral lesions.
- "Marie–Strümpel Disease": also known as ankylosing spondylitis; a severe arthritic spinal deformity. Named along with German neurologist Adolph Strümpell (1853–1925). The disease is sometimes referred to as "Bekhterev Disease"; named after Russian neurophysiologist Vladimir Bekhterev (1857–1927).
- "Marie-Léri syndrome": hand deformity caused by osteolysis of the articular surfaces of the fingers. Named with neurologist André Léri (1875–1930).
- "Bamberger-Marie disease": also known as hypertrophic pulmonary osteoarthropathy. Named with Austrian internist Eugen von Bamberger (1858–1921).
- “Charcot–Marie–Tooth disease”: a hereditary polyneuropathy of the peripheral nervous system. Named along with French neurologist Jean-Martin Charcot (1825–1893) and British neurologist Howard Henry Tooth (1856–1925).

== Selected writings ==
Medical Writings:

- Des formes frustes de la maladie de Basedow, doctoral thesis, Paris, 1883.
- Sur deux cas d’acromégalie, 1886.
- Sur une form particulière d'atrophie musculaire progressive; souvent familiale, débutant par les pieds et les jambes et atteignant tard les mains, With Jean Martin Charcot. 1886
- "Essays on Acromegaly", with bibliography and appendix of cases by other authors. London, 1891.
- Leçons sur les maladies de la moëlle épinière, Paris, 1892. English translation by M. Lubbock as "Lectures on Diseases of the Spinal Cord", London, 1895.
- Sur l'hérédo-ataxie cérébelleuse, Semaine médicale, Paris, 1893, 13: 444.
- L’évolution du langage considéré au point de vue de l’étude de l’Aphasie, 1897.
- Dysostose cléido-crânienne héréditaire, with Paul Sainton (1868–1958); 1897.
- Spondylose rhizomélique, 1898.
- Neurologie, two volumes; 1923.

Political Writings:

- Force et Santé Pour Tous, ou Le Triomphe de La Culture Physique (1928)
- Pour La Santé du Sédentaire (1931)
- Pour Le Sport Ouvrier (1934)

== See also ==
- A Clinical Lesson at the Salpêtrière – 1887 group tableau portrait by André Brouillet

== Bibliography ==
- "Pierre Marie". Who Named It. Archived from the original on May 21, 2002. (biography)
- David G. Andrewes (2001). Neuropsychology. Psychology Press. ISBN 1-84169-103-8.
