= LRRIQ3 =

Protein found in humans

Identifiers
- Aliases: LRRIQ3, LRRC44, leucine-rich repeats and IQ motif containing 3, leucine rich repeats and IQ motif containing 3
- External IDs: OMIM: 617957; MGI: 1921685; GeneCards: LRRIQ3

Gene location (Human)
Chr.	Chromosome 1 (human)
Band	1p31.1	Start	74,026,015 bp
Band	1p31.1	End	74,198,187 bp

Gene location (Mouse)
Chr.	Chromosome 3 (mouse)
Band	3|3 H4	Start	154,799,071 bp
Band	3|3 H4	End	154,899,917 bp
RNA expression pattern
Bgee	Human / Mouse (ortholog); Top expressed in: testicle; left testis; right testis; buccal mucosa cell; gonad; sperm; secondary oocyte; bronchial epithelial cell; right uterine tube; mucosa of paranasal sinus / Top expressed in: spermatid; spermatocyte; seminiferous tubule; zygote; gastrula; secondary oocyte; primary oocyte; lumbar spinal ganglion; lumbar subsegment of spinal cord; submandibular gland; More reference expression data
BioGPS	n/a
Orthologs
Databases	NCBI: entry; OMA: entry
Species	Human	Mouse
Entrez	127255	74435
Ensembl	ENSG00000162620	ENSMUSG00000028182
UniProt	A6PVS8; H0Y5F9	Q14DL3
RefSeq (mRNA)	NM_001105659; NM_145258; NM_001322315	NM_028938
RefSeq (protein)	NP_001099129; NP_001309244	NP_083214
Location (UCSC)	Chr 1: 74.03 – 74.2 Mb	Chr 3: 154.8 – 154.9 Mb
PubMed search
- Wikidata
View/Edit Human	View/Edit Mouse

LRRIQ3 (Leucine-rich repeats and IQ motif containing 3), which is also known as LRRC44, is a protein that in humans is encoded by the LRRIQ3 gene. It is predominantly expressed in the testes, and is linked to a number of diseases.

== Gene ==
=== Locus ===
LRRIQ3 is found on the minus strand of the end of the short arm of human chromosome 1 at 1p31.1.

=== Overall Structure ===
There are a total of 7 exons in the putative sequence of LRRIQ3.

== mRNA ==
=== Expression ===
LRRIQ3 is expressed as 2 primary isoforms, which produce proteins of length 624 amino acids and 464 amino acids respectively. It is expressed at low levels in human and brown rat tissues, with highest expression levels in testes tissue. There are relatively high expression levels in T cells, the epididymis, the kidney, and a number of glands.

== Protein ==
=== General characteristics and compositional features ===
Human protein LRRIQ3 Isoform 1 consists of 624 amino acids, and has a molecular weight of 73.7 kDa. The isoelectric point of LRRIQ3 is 9.73, which suggests that LRRIQ3 is basic at normal physiological pH (~7.4). Additionally, there is strong evidence that human LRRIQ3 localizes to the plasma membrane from antibody staining. LRRIQ3 is rich in lysine residues, with a total of 82 lysines. It is also slightly low on glycines.

=== Domains and motifs ===
In total, there are 4 conserved domains within LRRIQ3: 3 leucine-rich repeats and 1 IQ calmodulin-binding motif. Leucine-rich repeats are typically involved in protein-protein interactions, and form a characteristic α/β horseshoe fold. An IQ motif provides a binding site for calmodulin (CaM) or CaM-like proteins.

=== Secondary and tertiary structure ===
LRRIQ3 is predicted to be mostly alpha-helical in structure, including a long alpha-helical C-terminal domain. It is also predicted to function as a monomer.

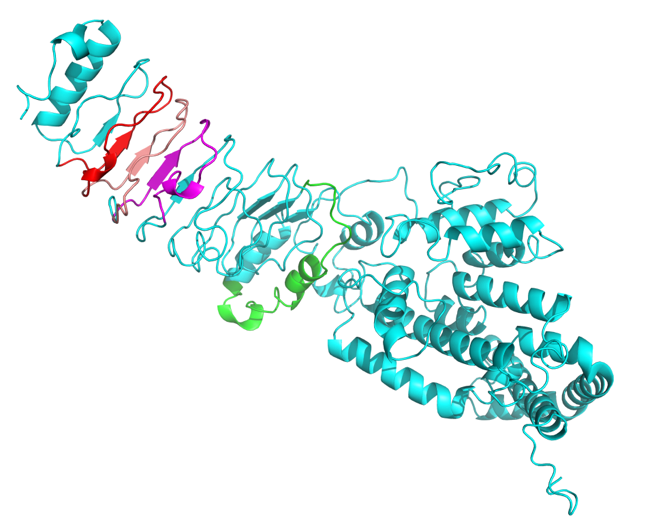
The best model generated by I-TASSER for LRRIQ3. The 3 leucine-rich repeats are shown in red, salmon, and magenta respectively. The IQ calmodulin-binding domain is shown in green.

=== Post-translational modifications ===
LRRIQ3 is predicted to undergo many post-translational modifications. These include O-GlcNAcylation, SUMOylation, ubiquitination, and phosphorylation. LRRIQ3 is predicted to have 4 well conserved SUMOylation sites and 1 well conserved ubiquitination site. A representation of these post-translational modifications is shown in the figure below.

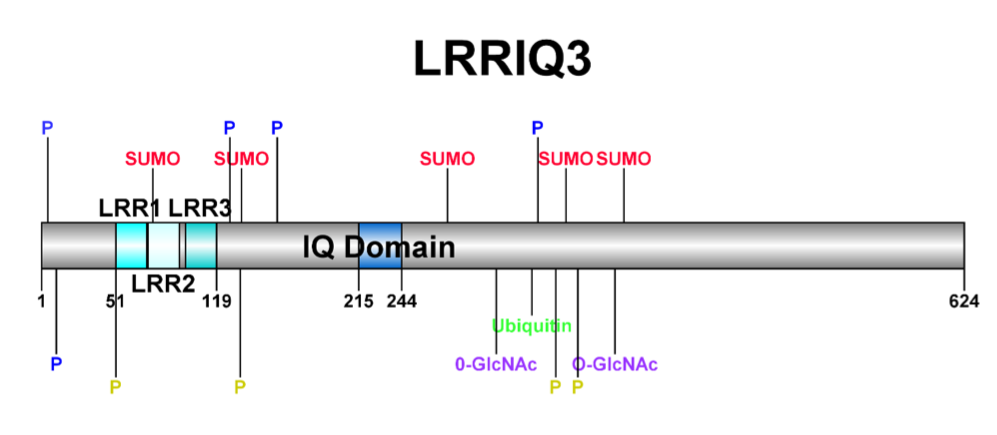
A representation of the domains, motif, and post-translational modification sites of LRRIQ3, generated using DOG 2.0

=== Protein interactions ===
There is evidence that LRRIQ3 interacts with a number of proteins from two-hybrid assays and affinity chromatography. The proteins LRRIQ3 interact with include LYN, NCK2, GNB4, and ABL1. These proteins are associated with cell signalling, cytoskeletal reorganization, and cell differentiation, as well as others.

== Homology and evolution ==
=== Paralogs and orthologs ===
No paralogs exists for LRRIQ3 in humans. However, there are a number of orthologs, as reported by BLAST, some of which are listed below. The number of years since divergence from the human protein, listed in "million of years ago (MYA)" below, were calculated using TimeTree.

Orthologs to Human LRRIQ3 Protein (NP_001099129.1)
Genus and species	Common name	Divergence from Human Lineage (MYA)	Accession number	Sequence length (aa)	Sequence Identity to Human Protein	Sequence Similarity to Human Protein
Gorilla gorilla gorilla	Gorilla	9.06	XP_004026030.1	624	97%	98%
Macaca mulatta	Rhesus monkey	29.44	XP_001097148.2	623	93%	95%
Ursus maritimus	Polar bear	96	XP_008689049.1	625	76%	87%
Felis catus	Domestic cat	96	XP_003990274.1	625	74%	86%
Camelus ferus	Bactrian camel	96	XP_006178380.1	618	73%	84%
Oryctolagus cuniculus	European rabbit	90	XP_002715603.1	622	71%	83%
Bison bison bison	American bison	96	XP_010847739.1	625	70%	82%
Trichechus manatus latirostris	Manatee	105	XP_004369192.1	623	70%	82%
Loxodonta africana	African elephant	105	XP_003411181.1	625	68%	80%
Condylura cristata	Star-nosed mole	96	XP_004679575.1	627	67%	80%
Eptesicus fuscus	Big brown bat	96	XP_008137759.1	621	66%	80%
Myotis davidii	Vesper bat	96	XP_006775977.1	618	65%	79%
Rattus norvegicus	Norway rat	90	NP_001019478.1	633	62%	77%
Mus Musculus	House mouse	90	NP_083214.2	633	63%	76%
Sorex araneus	Common shrew	96	XP_004603704.1	612	55%	73%
Chrysemys picta bellii	Painted turtle	312	XP_005285573.1	624	40%	56%
Pogona vitticeps	Bearded dragon	312	XP_020650341.1	651	35%	54%
Apteryx australis mantelli	Brown kiwi	312	XP_013800580.1	664	35%	54%
Struthio camelus australis	Southern Ostrich	312	XP_009685099.1	628	34%	51%

== Clinical significance ==
LRRIQ3 is linked to a number of cancers. RNA-seq experiments have shown that LRRIQ3 is severely down-regulated (Log_{2}-fold changes between -3.4 and -4.2) in a number of disease states, including pancreatic cancer, colorectal cancer, and breast cancer.
