= Dejerine–Sottas disease =

Dejerine–Sottas syndrome
- Other names: Charcot–Marie–Tooth disease type 3, Dejerine–Sottas syndrome, hereditary motor and sensory polyneuropathy type III
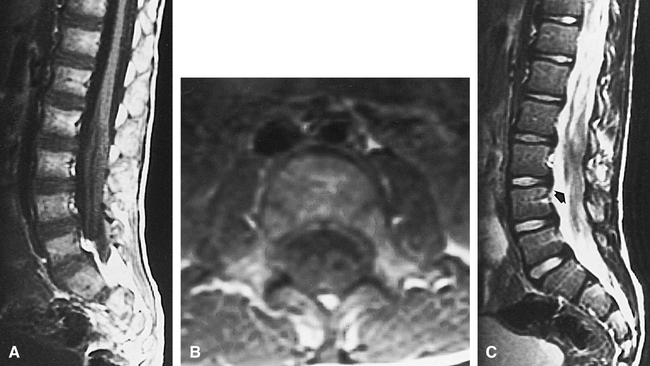
- MRI compatible with Dejerine-Sottas type spinal nerve enlargement
- Specialty: Neurology
- Symptoms: Weakness, reduced muscle tone, loss of sensation in extremities
- Usual onset: Infancy or early childhood
- Causes: Genetic mutations
- Diagnostic method: Medical imaging
- Frequency: 0.0001%

Dejerine–Sottas disease (also known as Dejerine–Sottas syndrome, hereditary motor and sensory polyneuropathy type III, and Charcot–Marie–Tooth disease type 3) is a hereditary neurological disorder characterized by damage to the peripheral nerves, demyelination, and resulting progressive muscle wasting and somatosensory loss. The condition is caused by mutations in various genes and currently has no known cure.

The disorder is named for Joseph Jules Dejerine and Jules Sottas, French neurologists who first described it.

== Signs and symptoms ==
Onset occurs in infancy or early childhood, usually before three years of age. Progression is slow until the teenage years at which point it may accelerate, resulting in severe disability.

Symptoms are more severe and rapidly progressive than in the other more common Charcot–Marie–Tooth diseases. Some patients may never walk and will be reliant on wheelchair use by the end of their first decade, while others may need only a cane, crutches, or similar support through most of their lives, but this is rare.

Dejerine–Sottas disease is characterized by moderate to severe lower and upper extremity weakness and loss of sensation, mainly in the lower legs, forearms, feet, and hands. Loss of muscle mass and reduced muscle tone usually occur as the disease progresses. Other symptoms may include pain in the extremities, curvature of the spine, clawed hands, foot deformities, ataxia, peripheral areflexia, and slow acquisition of motor skills in childhood. Symptoms that are less common can include limitation of eye movements, other eye problems such as nystagmus or anisocoria, or moderate to severe hearing loss.

== Causes ==
Dejerine–Sottas neuropathy is caused by a genetic defect either in the proteins found in axons or the proteins found in myelin. Specifically, it has been associated with mutations in MPZ, PMP22, PRX, and EGR2 genes. The disorder is inherited in an autosomal dominant or autosomal recessive manner.

== Diagnosis ==
On medical imaging, the peripheral and cranial nerves are enlarged by redundant connective tissue. On histology, this enlargement gives the nerves the appearance of an onion-bulb. Nerve excitability and conduction speed are reduced.

== Treatment ==
Management is symptomatic for this condition.

== See also ==
- Charcot–Marie–Tooth disease
