= Jules Sottas =

French neurologist (1866–1945)

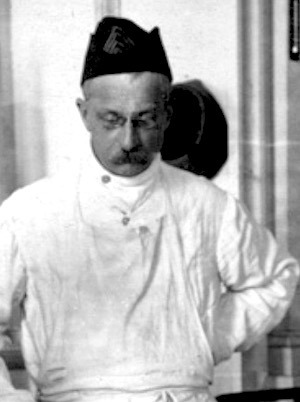
Jules Sottas

Jules Sottas (22 May 1866, Paris – 28 September 1945, Paris) was a French neurologist.

He studied medicine in Paris, and worked in the laboratories at the Hospice de Bicêtre and the Salpêtrière. In 1894 he received his doctorate in medicine. In Paris, he was an assistant to neurologist Joseph Jules Dejerine, with whom he collaborated on a number of studies, the best known being the eponymous "Dejerine–Sottas syndrome". The following are a list of various medical papers published by Dejerine and Sottas:

- Sur un cas de syringomyélie unilatérale et à début tardif suivi d'autopsie, 1892 - A case of unilateral syringomyelia with a late onset.
- Sur un cas de cécité corticale diagnostiquée pendant la vie et confirmée par l'autopsie, 1893 - A case of cortical blindness diagnosed during life and confirmed by autopsy.
- Sur un cas de maladie de Thomsen suivi d'autopsie, 1895 - A case involving Thomsen disease.
- Sur la névrite interstitielle, hypertrophique et progressive de l'enfance, 1893 - On interstitial hypertrophic progressive childhood neuritis, (Dejerine-Sottas neuropathy described).
- Note sur un cas de paraplégie spasmodique acquise, par sclérose primitive des cordons latéraux, 1895 - On a case of acquired spastic paraplegia with primary sclerosis of the lateral columns.
- Sur un cas de dégénerescence ascendante dans les cordons antérieurs et latéraux de la moelle, 1895 - A case of ascending degeneration in the anterior and lateral columns of the spinal cord
- Sur la distribution des fibres endogènes dans le cordon postérieur de la moelle et sur la constitution du cordon de Goll, 1895 - On the distribution of endogenous fibers in the posterior column of the spinal cord and on the constitution of the column of Goll.

Among his solo efforts, he published a study on syphilitic spinal paralysis, titled Contribution à l’étude anatomique et clinique des paralysies spinales syphilitiques (1894). In addition to his neurological research, Sottas was the author of several works with historical themes, the following being a few of his better known writings in this field:

- Histoire de la Compagnie royale des Indes orientales, 1664-1719, 1905 - History of the Royal East India Company.
- L'astrolabe-quadrant du Musée des antiquités de Rouen, 1910 - The Astrolabe Quadrant at the Museum of Antiquities in Rouen.
- Les messageries maritimes de Venise aux XIVe & XVe siècles, 1938 - Messageries Maritimes of Venice in the fourteenth and fifteenth centuries.
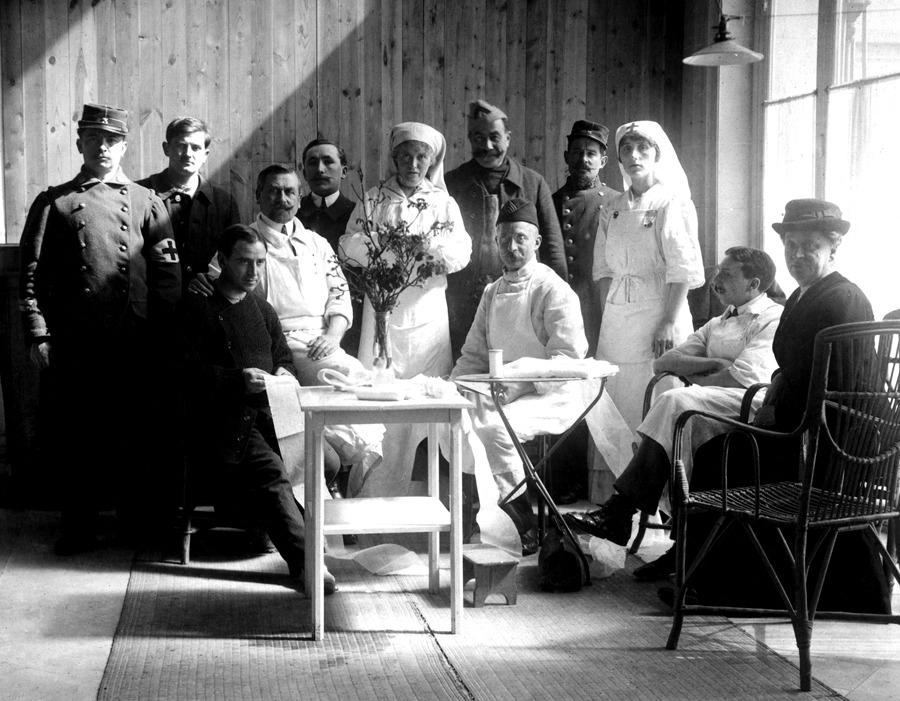
Jules Sottas (1866–1945), forgotten despite the eponym "Dejerine–Sottas syndrome"

== Associated eponym ==
- "Dejerine–Sottas neuropathy": A congenital form of hypertrophic neuritis characterized by sensorimotor disturbances in the extremities. The disease begins in early childhood and is slowly progressive.
