= Peripheral myelin protein 22 =

Protein-coding gene in the species Homo sapiens

PMP22

Identifiers
- Aliases: PMP22, CMT1A, CMT1E, DSS, GAS-3, HMSNIA, HNPP, Sujojp110, GAS3, peripheral myelin protein 22, CIDP, Sp110
- External IDs: OMIM: 601097; MGI: 97631; GeneCards: PMP22

Gene location (Human)
Chr.	Chromosome 17 (human)
Band	17p12	Start	15,229,773 bp
Band	17p12	End	15,272,292 bp

Gene location (Mouse)
Chr.	Chromosome 11 (mouse)
Band	11 B3|11 38.99 cM	Start	63,019,808 bp
Band	11 B3|11 38.99 cM	End	63,050,373 bp
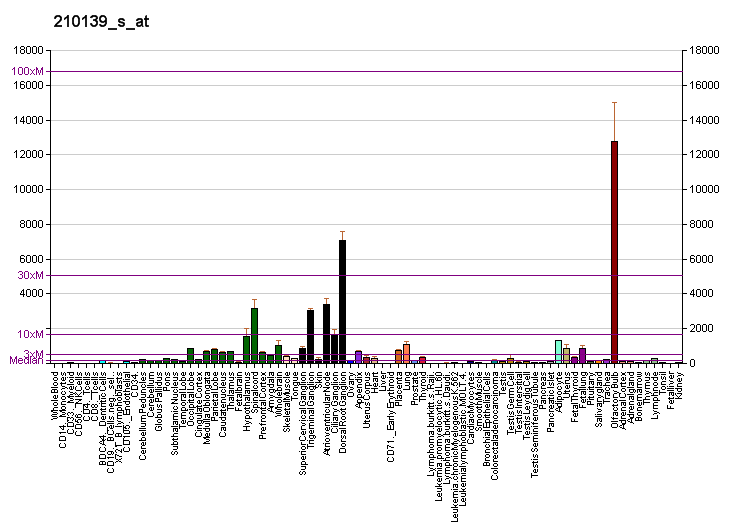
RNA expression pattern
Bgee	Human / Mouse (ortholog); Top expressed in: olfactory bulb; trigeminal ganglion; spinal ganglia; tibial nerve; synovial joint; skin of hip; optic nerve; Achilles tendon; inferior olivary nucleus; cartilage tissue / Top expressed in: sciatic nerve; utricle; ankle; right lung lobe; ankle joint; anterior horn of spinal cord; left colon; vestibular sensory epithelium; carotid body; facial motor nucleus; More reference expression data
BioGPS	More reference expression data
Gene ontology
Molecular function	protein binding
Cellular component	integral component of membrane; compact myelin; plasma membrane; membrane; bicellular tight junction
Biological process	myelination; cell differentiation; bleb assembly; cell death; negative regulation of neuron projection development; peripheral nervous system development; negative regulation of cell population proliferation; chemical synaptic transmission; myelin assembly
Sources:Amigo / QuickGO
Orthologs
Databases	NCBI: entry; OMA: entry
Species	Human	Mouse
Entrez	5376	18858
Ensembl	ENSG00000109099	ENSMUSG00000018217
UniProt	Q01453	P16646
RefSeq (mRNA)	NM_000304; NM_001281455; NM_001281456; NM_153321; NM_153322 NM_001330143	NM_001302255; NM_001302257; NM_001302258; NM_001302259; NM_001302260 NM_001302261; NM_008885
RefSeq (protein)	NP_000295; NP_001268384; NP_001268385; NP_001317072; NP_696996 NP_696997	NP_001289184; NP_001289186; NP_001289187; NP_001289188; NP_001289189 NP_001289190; NP_032911; NP_001391071; NP_001391072; NP_001391206; NP_001391207; NP_001391208; NP_001391209; NP_001391210; NP_001391211; NP_001391212; NP_001391213; NP_001391214; NP_001391215; NP_001391216; NP_001391217; NP_001391218; NP_001391219
Location (UCSC)	Chr 17: 15.23 – 15.27 Mb	Chr 11: 63.02 – 63.05 Mb
PubMed search
- Wikidata
View/Edit Human	View/Edit Mouse

Peripheral myelin protein 22 (PMP22), also called Growth arrest-specific protein 3 (GAS-3), is a protein which in humans is encoded by the PMP22 gene. Mutations in PMP22 cause changes in the expression of peripheral myelin protein 22 which can result in several neuropathies.

PMP22 is a 22 kDa transmembrane glycoprotein made up of 160 amino acids, and is mainly expressed in the Schwann cells of the peripheral nervous system. Schwann cells show high expression of PMP22, where it can constitute 2-5% of total protein content in compact myelin. Compact myelin is the bulk of the peripheral neuron's myelin sheath, a protective fatty layer that provides electrical insulation for the neuronal axon. The level of PMP22 expression is relatively low in the central nervous system of adults.

Like other membrane proteins, newly translated PMP22 protein is temporarily sequestered to the endoplasmic reticulum (ER) and Golgi apparatus for post-translational modifications. PMP22 protein is glycosylated with an N terminus-linked sugar and co-localized with the chaperone protein calnexin in the ER. After the protein is transported to the Golgi apparatus it can then become incorporated in the plasma membrane of the cell.

== Structure and function ==
In humans, the PMP22 gene is located on chromosome 17p12 and spans approximately 40kb. The gene contains six exons conserved in both humans and rodents, two of which are 5' untranslated exons (1a and 1b) and result in two different RNA transcripts with identical coding sequences. The two transcripts differ in their 5' untranslated regions and have their own promoter regulating expression. Exon 1a corresponds to protein transcription in the peripheral myelin sheath, while exon 1b corresponds to tissue outside of the nervous system. The remaining exons (2 to 5) include the coding region of the PMP22 gene, and are joined together after post-transcriptional modification (i.e. alternative splicing). The PMP22 protein is characterized by four transmembrane domains, two extracellular loops (ECL1 and ECL2), and one intracellular loop. Exon 2 codes for the first transmembrane domain, located on the N-terminus of the PMP22 protein. Exon 3 codes for the first extracellular loop. Exon 4 corresponds to the second transmembrane domain and half of the third. Exon 5 is responsible for the rest of the third and the fourth transmembrane domain, the second extracellular loop, and the 3' UTR. ECL1 has been suggested to mediate a homophilic interaction between two PMP22 proteins, whereas ECL2 has been shown to mediate a heterophilic interaction between PMP22 protein and Myelin protein zero (MPZ).

Although the PMP22 mechanism of action in myelinating Schwann cells is not fully known, it plays an essential role in the formation and maintenance of compact myelin. When Schwann cells come into contact with a neuronal axon, expression of PMP22 is significantly up-regulated, whereas PMP22 is down-regulated during axonal degeneration or transection. PMP22 has shown association with zonula-occludens 1 and occludin, proteins that are involved in adhesion with other cells and the extracellular matrix, and also support functioning of myelin. Along with cell adhesion function, PMP22 is also up-regulated during Schwann cell proliferation, suggesting a role in cell-cycle regulation. PMP22 is detectable in non-neural tissues, where its expression has been shown to serve as growth-arrest-specific (gas-3) function.

== Gene-dosage ==
Improper gene dosage of the PMP22 gene can cause aberrant protein synthesis and function of myelin sheath. Since the components of myelin are stoichiometrically set, any irregular expression of a component can cause destabilization of myelin and neuropathic disorders. Alterations of PMP22 gene expression are associated with a variety of neuropathies, such as Charcot–Marie–Tooth type 1A (CMT1A), Dejerine–Sottas disease, Hereditary Neuropathy with Liability to Pressure Palsy (HNPP), and Charcot-Marie-Tooth type 1E (CMT1E). Too much PMP22 (e.g. caused by gene duplication) results in CMT1A, and too little PMP22 (e.g. caused by gene deletion) results in HNPP. Point mutations in PMP22 can result in CMT1E. Gene duplication of PMP22 is the most common genetic cause of CMT; up to half of all cases confirmed by a genetic diagnosis are caused by a 1.4 Mb duplication on chromosome 17, which contains the PMP22 gene. Overproduction of PMP22 results in defects in multiple signaling pathways and dysfunction of transcriptional factors like KNOX20, SOX10 and EGR2.

== Interactions and Regulation ==
PMP22 has been found to interact with several different factors, some of which regulate expression. Peripheral myelin protein 22 has been shown to interact with myelin protein zero, with the proteins forming complexes in myelin. Transcription factors SOX10 and EGR2 have been found to increase the expression of PMP22 through a super-enhancer upstream of the gene. TEAD1 and YAP/TAZ (of the hippo signaling pathway) have been found to bind at the enhancers, with studies showing a decrease in PMP22 expression with the knockdown of these factors. Additionally, PKC activators and HDAC inhibitors have been characterized as regulators of PMP22, as well as microRNAs such as miR-29a and miR-381.
