= LITAF =

Protein-coding gene in the species Homo sapiens

Identifiers
- Aliases: LITAF, PIG7, SIMPLE, TP53I7, lipopolysaccharide induced TNF factor
- External IDs: OMIM: 603795; MGI: 1929512; HomoloGene: 37974; GeneCards: LITAF; OMA:LITAF - orthologs

Gene location (Human)
Chr.	Chromosome 16 (human)
Band	16p13.13	Start	11,547,722 bp
Band	16p13.13	End	11,636,381 bp

Gene location (Mouse)
Chr.	Chromosome 16 (mouse)
Band	16|16 A1	Start	10,777,139 bp
Band	16|16 A1	End	10,884,021 bp
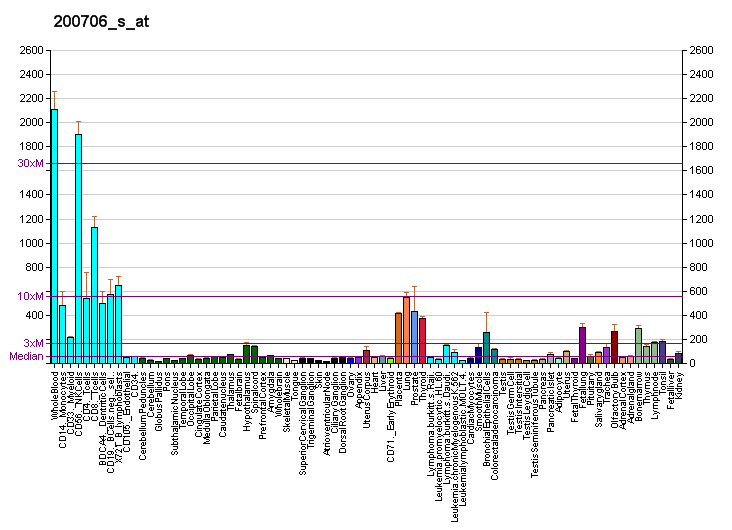

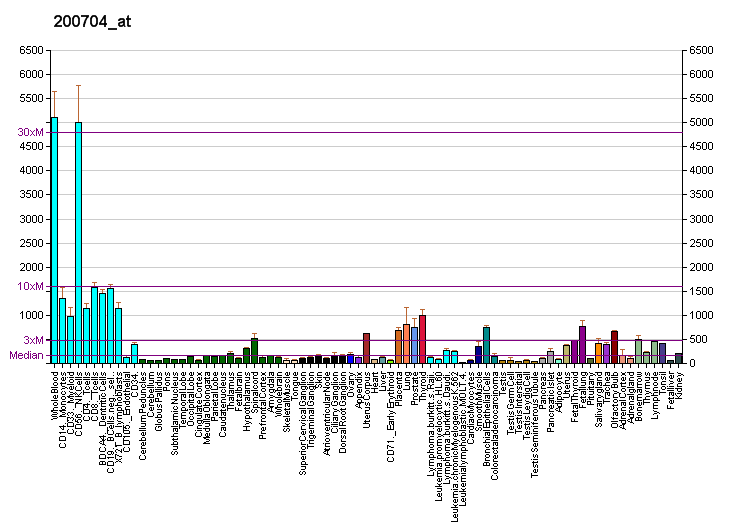
RNA expression pattern
Bgee	Human / Mouse (ortholog); Top expressed in: blood; palpebral conjunctiva; periodontal fiber; visceral pleura; mucosa of urinary bladder; appendix; tibia; granulocyte; canal of the cervix; gallbladder / Top expressed in: granulocyte; endothelial cell of lymphatic vessel; stroma of bone marrow; blood; decidua; vestibular sensory epithelium; left colon; gastrula; vestibular membrane of cochlear duct; skin of external ear; More reference expression data
BioGPS	More reference expression data
Gene ontology
Molecular function	signal transducer activity; protein binding; WW domain binding; zinc ion binding; RNA polymerase II cis-regulatory region sequence-specific DNA binding; DNA-binding transcription activator activity, RNA polymerase II-specific; DNA binding; metal ion binding
Cellular component	membrane; nucleoplasm; lysosomal membrane; lysosome; cytosol; cytoplasmic side of plasma membrane; cytoplasmic side of early endosome membrane; cytoplasmic side of late endosome membrane; cytoplasmic side of lysosomal membrane; Golgi membrane; nucleus; cytoplasm; endosome; Golgi apparatus; plasma membrane; endosome membrane; early endosome membrane; late endosome membrane; intracellular membrane-bounded organelle; integral component of membrane
Biological process	regulation of transcription, DNA-templated; regulation of transcription by RNA polymerase II; ageing; transcription, DNA-templated; regulation of cytokine production; response to lipopolysaccharide; positive regulation of I-kappaB kinase/NF-kappaB signaling; cellular response to lipopolysaccharide; signal transduction; transcription by RNA polymerase II; positive regulation of transcription by RNA polymerase II
Sources:Amigo / QuickGO
Orthologs
Species	Human	Mouse
Entrez	9516	56722
Ensembl	ENSG00000189067	ENSMUSG00000022500
UniProt	Q99732	Q9JLJ0
RefSeq (mRNA)	NM_001136472; NM_001136473; NM_004862	NM_019980
RefSeq (protein)	NP_001129944; NP_001129945; NP_004853	NP_064364
Location (UCSC)	Chr 16: 11.55 – 11.64 Mb	Chr 16: 10.78 – 10.88 Mb
PubMed search
- Wikidata
View/Edit Human	View/Edit Mouse

Lipopolysaccharide-induced tumor necrosis factor-alpha factor is a protein that in humans is encoded by the LITAF gene.

It is associated with Charcot–Marie–Tooth disease 1C.
