= INF2 =

Protein-coding gene in the species Homo sapiens

Identifiers
- Aliases: INF2, C14orf151, C14orf173, CMTDIE, FSGS5, pp9484, inverted formin, FH2 and WH2 domain containing, inverted formin 2
- External IDs: OMIM: 610982; MGI: 1917685; GeneCards: INF2

Gene location (Human)
Chr.	Chromosome 14 (human)
Band	14q32.33	Start	104,681,146 bp
Band	14q32.33	End	104,722,535 bp

Gene location (Mouse)
Chr.	Chromosome 12 (mouse)
Band	12|12 F1	Start	112,588,784 bp
Band	12|12 F1	End	112,615,557 bp
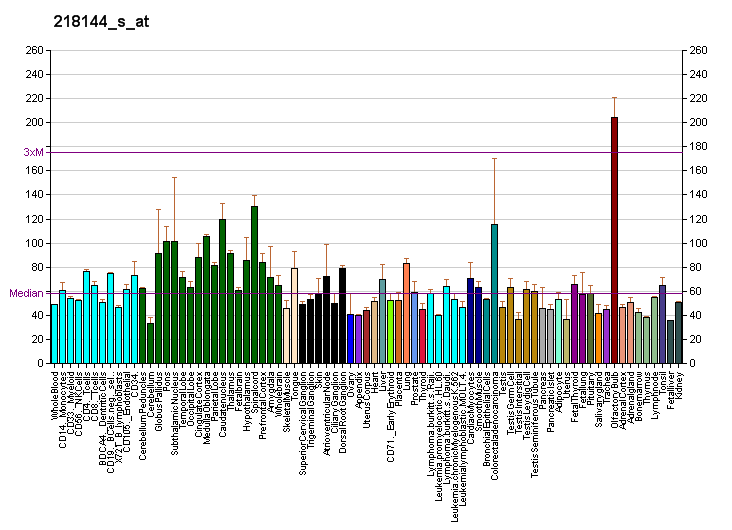
RNA expression pattern
Bgee	Human / Mouse (ortholog); Top expressed in: sural nerve; C1 segment; mucosa of transverse colon; right coronary artery; gastric mucosa; left coronary artery; popliteal artery; tibial arteries; putamen; right frontal lobe / Top expressed in: gastrula; superior frontal gyrus; olfactory tubercle; decidua; nucleus accumbens; stroma of bone marrow; primary visual cortex; epithelium of lens; transitional epithelium of urinary bladder; renal corpuscle; More reference expression data
BioGPS	More reference expression data
Gene ontology
Molecular function	actin binding
Cellular component	cytoplasm; perinuclear region of cytoplasm
Biological process	regulation of mitochondrial fission; actin cytoskeleton organization; cellular component organization
Sources:Amigo / QuickGO
Orthologs
Databases	NCBI: entry; OMA: entry
Species	Human	Mouse
Entrez	64423	70435
Ensembl	ENSG00000203485	ENSMUSG00000037679
UniProt	Q27J81	Q0GNC1
RefSeq (mRNA)	NM_001031714; NM_022489; NM_032714	NM_198411
RefSeq (protein)	NP_001026884; NP_071934; NP_116103	NP_940803; NP_001361128
Location (UCSC)	Chr 14: 104.68 – 104.72 Mb	Chr 12: 112.59 – 112.62 Mb
PubMed search
- Wikidata
View/Edit Human	View/Edit Mouse

Inverted formin-2 is a protein that in humans is encoded by the INF2 gene. It belongs to the protein family called the formins. It has two splice isoforms, CAAX which localizes to the endoplasmic reticulum and non-CAAX which localizes to focal adhesions and the cytoplasm with enrichment at the Golgi. INF2 plays a role in mitochondrial fission and dorsal stress fiber formation. INF2 accelerates actin nucleation and elongation by interacting with barbed ends (fast-growing ends) of actin filaments, but also accelerates disassembly of actin through encircling and severing filaments.

== Clinical significance ==
It can be associated with Focal segmental glomerulosclerosis and Charcot-Marie-Tooth Disease.
