= CMTX2 =

Protein-coding gene in humans

Identifiers
- Aliases: CMTX2, Charcot-Marie-Tooth neuropathy, X-linked 2 (recessive)
- External IDs: GeneCards: CMTX2
Orthologs
Databases	NCBI: entry
Species	Human	Mouse
Entrez	1253	n/a
Ensembl	n/a	n/a
UniProt	n a	n/a
RefSeq (mRNA)	n/a	n/a
RefSeq (protein)	n/a	n/a
Location (UCSC)	n/a	n/a
PubMed search		n/a
- Wikidata
View/Edit Human

Charcot-Marie-Tooth neuropathy, X-linked 2 (recessive) is a protein that in humans is encoded by the CMTX2 gene. Its cytogenetic location is Xp22.2. It is associated with a variant of Charcot–Marie–Tooth disease.
