= Myelin P2 protein =

Protein-coding gene in humans

PMP2
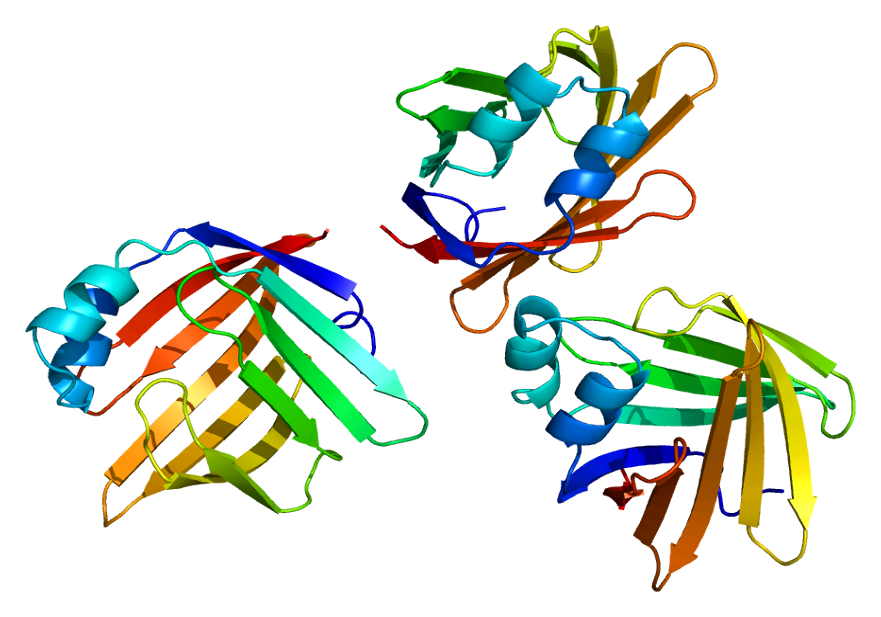

Identifiers
- Aliases: PMP2, FABP8, M-FABP, MP2, P2, peripheral myelin protein 2, Myelin P2 protein, CMT1G
- External IDs: OMIM: 170715; MGI: 102667; GeneCards: PMP2
Available structures
PDB	Ortholog search: PDBe RCSB
PDB	List of PDB id codes 2WUT, 3NR3, 4A1H, 4A1Y, 4A8Z, 4BVM, 4D6A, 4D6B

Gene location (Human)
Chr.	Chromosome 8 (human)
Band	8q21.13	Start	81,440,326 bp
Band	8q21.13	End	81,447,439 bp

Gene location (Mouse)
Chr.	Chromosome 3 (mouse)
Band	3 A1|3 2.54 cM	Start	10,244,911 bp
Band	3 A1|3 2.54 cM	End	10,248,989 bp
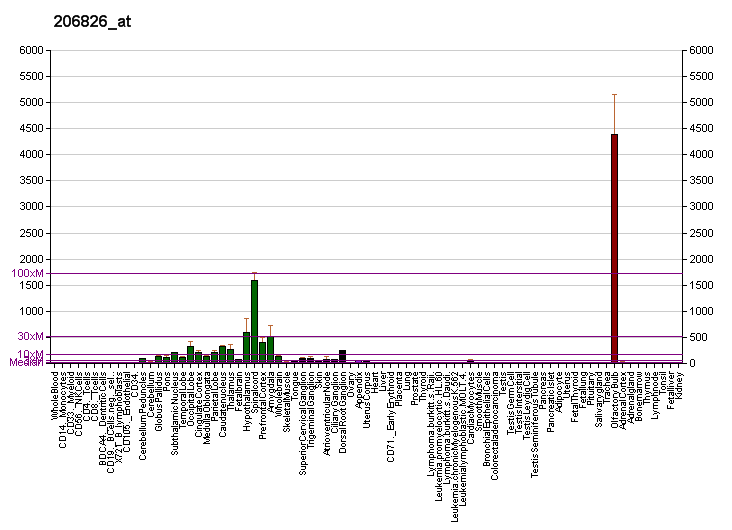
RNA expression pattern
Bgee	Human / Mouse (ortholog); Top expressed in: olfactory bulb; superior vestibular nucleus; trigeminal ganglion; inferior ganglion of vagus nerve; ventral tegmental area; subthalamic nucleus; external globus pallidus; pars reticulata; pars compacta; internal globus pallidus / Top expressed in: blastocyst; morula; spermatocyte; neural layer of retina; skeletal muscle tissue; quadriceps femoris muscle; zone of skin; testicle; esophagus; white adipose tissue; More reference expression data
BioGPS	More reference expression data
Gene ontology
Molecular function	fatty acid binding; cholesterol binding; protein binding; lipid binding; transporter activity
Cellular component	cytoplasm; myelin sheath; extracellular exosome
Biological process	membrane organization; transport
Sources:Amigo / QuickGO
Orthologs
Databases	NCBI: entry; OMA: entry
Species	Human	Mouse
Entrez	5375	18857
Ensembl	ENSG00000147588	ENSMUSG00000052468
UniProt	P02689	P24526
RefSeq (mRNA)	NM_002677; NM_001348381	NM_001030305
RefSeq (protein)	NP_002668; NP_001335310	NP_001025476
Location (UCSC)	Chr 8: 81.44 – 81.45 Mb	Chr 3: 10.24 – 10.25 Mb
PubMed search
- Wikidata
View/Edit Human	View/Edit Mouse

Myelin P2 protein also peripheral myelin protein 2, is a protein that in humans is encoded by the PMP2 gene. Myelin protein P2 is a constituent of peripheral nervous system (PNS) myelin, also present in small amounts in central nervous system (CNS) myelin. As a structural protein, P2 is thought to stabilize the myelin membranes, and may play a role in lipid transport in Schwann cells. Structurally, P2 belongs to the family of cytoplasmic fatty acid-binding proteins (FABPs).
