= PRX (gene) =

Protein-coding gene in the species Homo sapiens

Identifiers
- Aliases: PRX, CMT4F, periaxin
- External IDs: OMIM: 605725; MGI: 108176; GeneCards: PRX
Available structures
PDB	Ortholog search: PDBe RCSB
PDB	List of PDB id codes 4CMZ

Gene location (Human)
Chr.	Chromosome 19 (human)
Band	19q13.2	Start	40,393,766 bp
Band	19q13.2	End	40,414,793 bp

Gene location (Mouse)
Chr.	Chromosome 7 (mouse)
Band	7 A3|7 15.91 cM	Start	27,196,813 bp
Band	7 A3|7 15.91 cM	End	27,219,639 bp
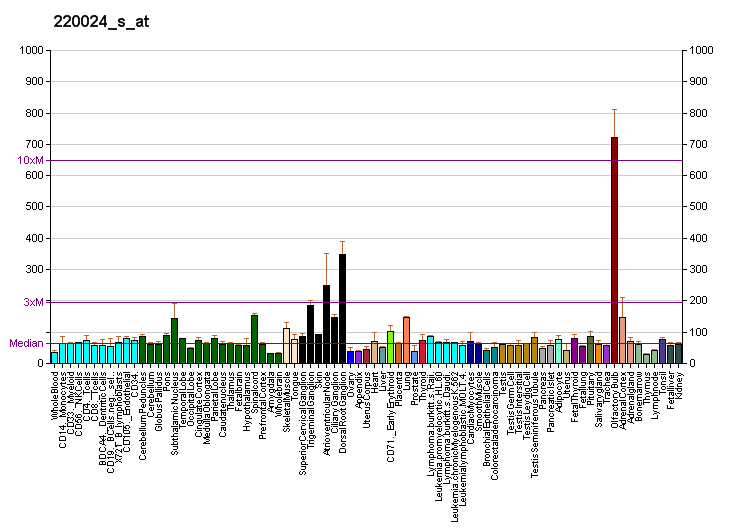
RNA expression pattern
Bgee	Human / Mouse (ortholog); Top expressed in: olfactory bulb; trigeminal ganglion; sural nerve; spinal ganglia; pancreatic ductal cell; right lung; upper lobe of left lung; triceps brachii muscle; glutes; right lobe of thyroid gland / Top expressed in: sciatic nerve; utricle; right lung; right lung lobe; left lung; left lung lobe; epithelium of lens; ankle; vestibular sensory epithelium; lumbar spinal ganglion; More reference expression data
BioGPS	More reference expression data
Gene ontology
Molecular function	protein binding; molecular function
Cellular component	cytoplasm; cell junction; plasma membrane; membrane; nucleus; T-tubule
Biological process	axon ensheathment; regulation of RNA splicing
Sources:Amigo / QuickGO
Orthologs
Databases	NCBI: entry; OMA: entry
Species	Human	Mouse
Entrez	57716	19153
Ensembl	ENSG00000105227	ENSMUSG00000053198
UniProt	Q9BXM0	O55103
RefSeq (mRNA)	NM_020956; NM_181882	NM_019412; NM_198048
RefSeq (protein)	NP_066007; NP_870998	NP_062285; NP_932165
Location (UCSC)	Chr 19: 40.39 – 40.41 Mb	Chr 7: 27.2 – 27.22 Mb
PubMed search
- Wikidata
View/Edit Human	View/Edit Mouse

Periaxin is a protein that in humans is encoded by the PRX gene.

The PRX gene encodes L- and S-periaxin, proteins of myelinating Schwann cells, and is mutated in Dejerine–Sottas syndrome (MIM 145900) and Charcot–Marie–Tooth disease type 4F (MIM 145900).[supplied by OMIM]
