= EGR2 =

Protein found in humans

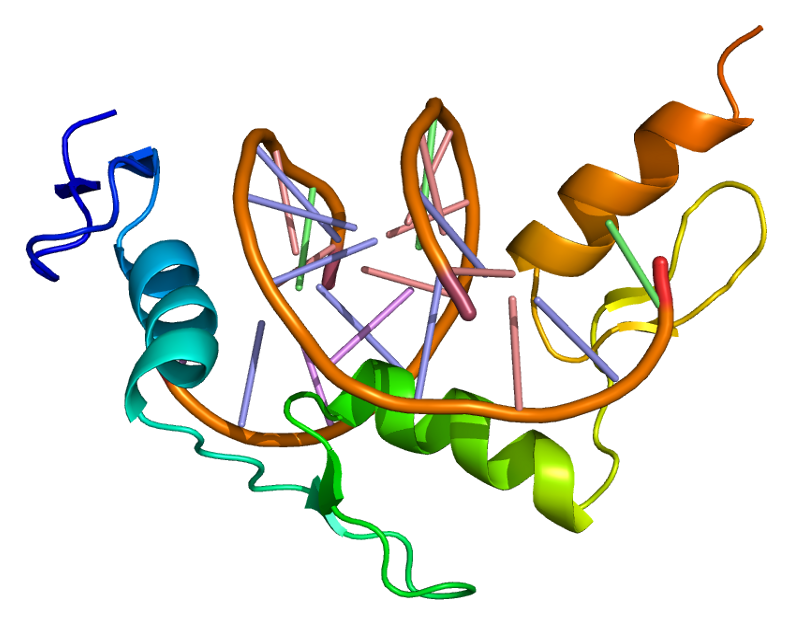

Identifiers
- Aliases: EGR2, AT591, CMT1D, CMT4E, KROX20, early growth response 2, CHN1
- External IDs: OMIM: 129010; MGI: 95296; GeneCards: EGR2

Gene location (Human)
Chr.	Chromosome 10 (human)
Band	10q21.3	Start	62,811,996 bp
Band	10q21.3	End	62,819,167 bp

Gene location (Mouse)
Chr.	Chromosome 10 (mouse)
Band	10 B5.1|10 34.96 cM	Start	67,535,475 bp
Band	10 B5.1|10 34.96 cM	End	67,542,188 bp
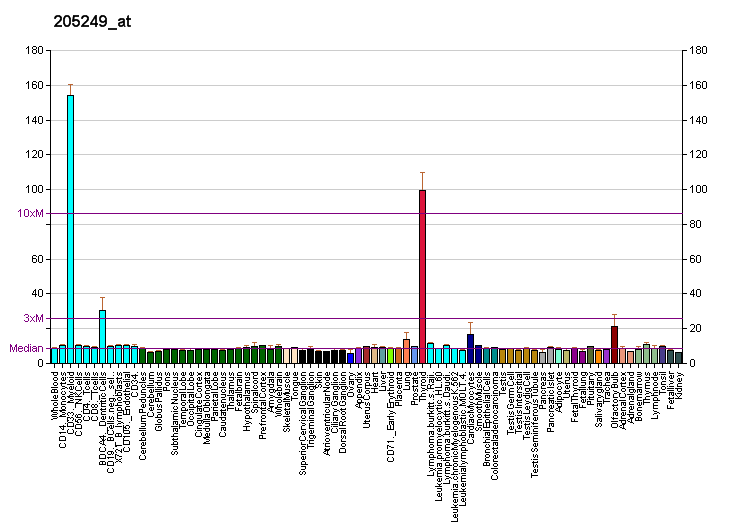
RNA expression pattern
Bgee	Human / Mouse (ortholog); Top expressed in: gallbladder; tibial nerve; granulocyte; testicle; monocyte; gastric mucosa; smooth muscle tissue; sural nerve; skin of abdomen; lymph node / Top expressed in: neural ectoderm; neuromere; rhombomere; lip; zone of skin; spinal nerve; ureter; urethra; thymus; male urethra; More reference expression data
BioGPS	More reference expression data
Gene ontology
Molecular function	DNA binding; DNA-binding transcription factor activity; HMG box domain binding; DNA-binding transcription activator activity, RNA polymerase II-specific; chromatin binding; metal ion binding; RNA polymerase II cis-regulatory region sequence-specific DNA binding; protein binding; nucleic acid binding; ubiquitin protein ligase binding; transferase activity; DNA-binding transcription factor activity, RNA polymerase II-specific; SUMO ligase activity
Cellular component	cytoplasm; nucleus; nucleoplasm; intracellular membrane-bounded organelle
Biological process	cellular response to organic substance; rhythmic behavior; peripheral nervous system development; regulation of transcription, DNA-templated; rhombomere 3 development; brain segmentation; transcription by RNA polymerase II; protein sumoylation; rhombomere 3 formation; transcription, DNA-templated; response to insulin; positive regulation of transcription, DNA-templated; brain development; rhombomere 5 formation; protein export from nucleus; learning or memory; skeletal muscle cell differentiation; Schwann cell differentiation; regulation of neuronal synaptic plasticity; myelination; facial nerve structural organization; regulation of ossification; motor neuron axon guidance; fat cell differentiation; positive regulation of transcription by RNA polymerase II; regulation of transcription by RNA polymerase II
Sources:Amigo / QuickGO
Orthologs
Databases	NCBI: entry; OMA: entry
Species	Human	Mouse
Entrez	1959	13654
Ensembl	ENSG00000122877	ENSMUSG00000037868
UniProt	P11161	P08152
RefSeq (mRNA)	NM_000399; NM_001136177; NM_001136178; NM_001136179; NM_001321037	NM_010118; NM_001347458
RefSeq (protein)	NP_000390; NP_001129649; NP_001129650; NP_001129651; NP_001307966	NP_001334387; NP_034248; NP_001360912; NP_001360914; NP_001360915 NP_001360916
Location (UCSC)	Chr 10: 62.81 – 62.82 Mb	Chr 10: 67.54 – 67.54 Mb
PubMed search
- Wikidata
View/Edit Human	View/Edit Mouse

Early growth response protein 2 (EGR2), also known as Krox20, is a transcription factor encoded by the EGR2 gene in humans. It is highly expressed in migrating neural crest cells and later in neural crest-derived cells of the cranial ganglia. Expression of EGR2 is restricted to early hindbrain development, and the gene is evolutionarily conserved among vertebrates, including humans, mice, chicks, and zebrafish. The conservation of its amino acid sequence and embryonic expression pattern underscores its essential role in hindbrain segmentation and neural differentiation.

== Structure ==
The EGR2 protein contains three tandem C2H2-type zinc finger domains that mediate specific DNA binding. These zinc fingers enable EGR2 to function as a transcriptional regulator of genes involved in neural development and myelination.

== Function ==
EGR2 acts as a transcription factor that regulates gene expression during neural development and peripheral nerve myelination. It binds to specific DNA sequences via its zinc finger motifs to control target genes essential for Schwann cell differentiation and myelin sheath formation. It is also expressed in osteoprogenitor cells and has been implicated in the proliferation of Ewing sarcoma–derived cell lines, suggesting a role in both bone biology and tumorigenesis.

== Clinical significance ==
Mutations in EGR2 are associated with several hereditary demyelinating neuropathies, including Charcot–Marie–Tooth disease type 1D, Dejerine–Sottas disease, and congenital hypomyelinating neuropathy. Recent studies have also suggested that EGR2 expression in hair follicle stem cells may influence hair maintenance and pigmentation, with loss of Krox20-expressing cells contributing to male-pattern baldness and graying hair.

Deletion of Egr2 in mice results in loss of protein-coding capacity, including the DNA-binding domain, leading to perinatal lethality and severe hindbrain malformations. These defects include aberrant formation of cranial sensory ganglia, fusion of the trigeminal (V), facial (VII), and auditory (VIII) nerves, and disorganization of their proximal roots as they enter the brainstem.
