= RAB7B =

Protein-coding gene in humans

Identifiers
- Aliases: RAB7B, RAB7, member RAS oncogene family
- External IDs: MGI: 2442295; GeneCards: RAB7B

Gene location (Human)
Chr.	Chromosome 1 (human)
Band	1q32.1	Start	205,976,740 bp
Band	1q32.1	End	206,003,461 bp

Gene location (Mouse)
Chr.	Chromosome 1 (mouse)
Band	1|1 E4	Start	131,616,433 bp
Band	1|1 E4	End	131,643,177 bp
RNA expression pattern
Bgee	Human / Mouse (ortholog); Top expressed in: skin of arm; skin of abdomen; gingival epithelium; skin of leg; skin of thigh; mucosa of esophagus; gallbladder; skin of hip; right coronary artery; vagina / Top expressed in: stroma of bone marrow; lip; skin of back; calvaria; epidermis; esophagus; skin of abdomen; umbilical cord; cornea; ankle; More reference expression data
BioGPS	n/a
Gene ontology
Molecular function	nucleotide binding; GTP binding; GTPase activity
Cellular component	endosome; late endosome; Golgi apparatus; trans-Golgi network; lysosome; phagocytic vesicle membrane; phagocytic vesicle; membrane; cytoplasmic vesicle; late endosome membrane; vacuolar membrane
Biological process	protein transport; negative regulation of toll-like receptor 9 signaling pathway; late endosome to Golgi transport; positive regulation of NF-kappaB transcription factor activity; positive regulation of megakaryocyte differentiation; negative regulation of toll-like receptor 4 signaling pathway; positive regulation of interleukin-6 production; cellular response to interferon-gamma; intracellular protein transport; endosome to lysosome transport; Rab protein signal transduction; phagosome-lysosome fusion
Sources:Amigo / QuickGO
Orthologs
Databases	NCBI: entry; OMA: entry
Species	Human	Mouse
Entrez	338382	226421
Ensembl	ENSG00000276600	ENSMUSG00000052688
UniProt	Q96AH8	Q8VEA8
RefSeq (mRNA)	NM_001164522; NM_001304839; NM_177403	NM_145509; NM_001311096
RefSeq (protein)	NP_001157994; NP_001291768; NP_796377	NP_001298025; NP_663484
Location (UCSC)	Chr 1: 205.98 – 206 Mb	Chr 1: 131.62 – 131.64 Mb
PubMed search
- Wikidata
View/Edit Human	View/Edit Mouse

Ras-related protein Rab-7b is a protein that in humans is encoded by the RAB7B gene.

== Function ==
Rab7 is a small GTPase that plays a role in the transport and degradation of proteins in endosomes and lysosomes in mammalian cells. Rab7b, is localized to lysosome-associated compartments and is selectively expressed in monocytic cells. By promoting the degradation of toll-like receptor 4, RAB7B can negatively regulate the inflammatory activation of macrophages.
