= MORC2 =

Protein-coding gene in the species Homo sapiens

Identifiers
- Aliases: MORC2, ZCW3, ZCWCC1, CMT2Z, MORC family CW-type zinc finger 2, DIGFAN
- External IDs: OMIM: 616661; MGI: 1921772; GeneCards: MORC2

Gene location (Human)
Chr.	Chromosome 22 (human)
Band	22q12.2	Start	30,925,130 bp
Band	22q12.2	End	30,968,774 bp

Gene location (Mouse)
Chr.	Chromosome 11 (mouse)
Band	11|11 A1	Start	3,599,191 bp
Band	11|11 A1	End	3,640,477 bp
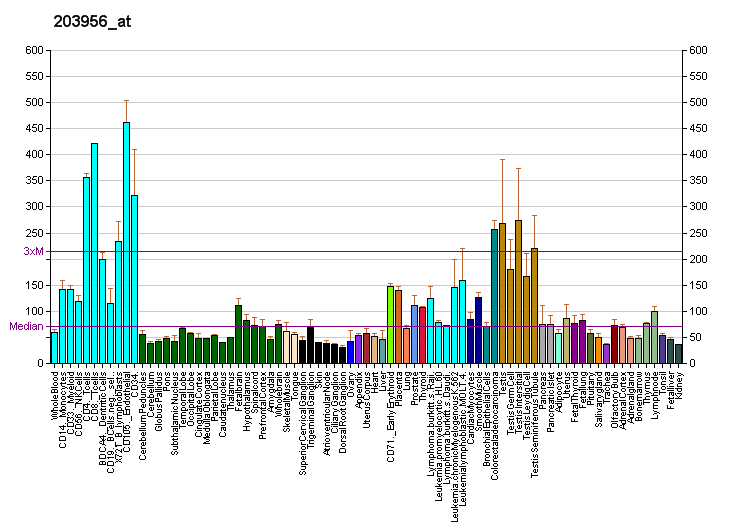

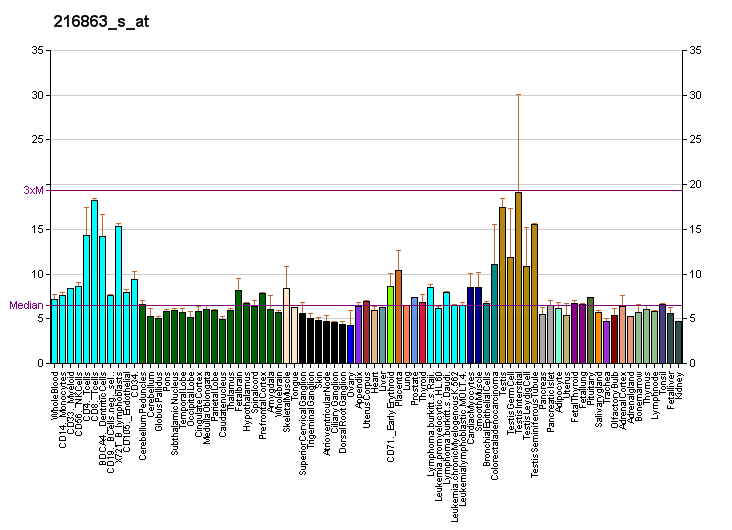
RNA expression pattern
Bgee	Human / Mouse (ortholog); Top expressed in: sperm; left testis; right testis; ganglionic eminence; endothelial cell; stromal cell of endometrium; saphenous vein; ventricular zone; testicle; gastric mucosa / Top expressed in: tail of embryo; genital tubercle; superior cervical ganglion; hand; zygote; spermatocyte; otolith organ; utricle; spermatid; epiblast; More reference expression data
BioGPS	More reference expression data
Gene ontology
Molecular function	zinc ion binding; metal ion binding; protein binding; magnesium ion binding; chromatin binding; ATP binding; ATPase activity; protein homodimerization activity; nucleotide binding; hydrolase activity
Cellular component	nucleus; cytoplasm; cytosol; heterochromatin; nuclear matrix; chromosome
Biological process	fatty acid metabolic process; lipid metabolism; cellular response to DNA damage stimulus; negative regulation of gene expression, epigenetic; negative regulation of single stranded viral RNA replication via double stranded DNA intermediate; positive regulation of DNA methylation-dependent heterochromatin assembly; chromatin remodeling
Sources:Amigo / QuickGO
Orthologs
Databases	NCBI: entry; OMA: entry
Species	Human	Mouse
Entrez	22880	74522
Ensembl	ENSG00000133422	ENSMUSG00000034543
UniProt	Q9Y6X9	Q69ZX6
RefSeq (mRNA)	NM_001303256; NM_001303257; NM_014941	NM_001159288; NM_198162; NM_001363202
RefSeq (protein)	NP_001290185; NP_001290186; NP_055756	NP_001152760; NP_937805; NP_001350131
Location (UCSC)	Chr 22: 30.93 – 30.97 Mb	Chr 11: 3.6 – 3.64 Mb
PubMed search
- Wikidata
View/Edit Human	View/Edit Mouse

MORC family CW-type zinc finger protein 2 is a protein that in humans is encoded by the MORC2 gene.
