= GDAP1 =

Protein-coding gene in humans

Identifiers
- Aliases: GDAP1, CMT4, CMT4A, CMTRIA, ganglioside induced differentiation associated protein 1
- External IDs: OMIM: 606598; MGI: 1338002; GeneCards: GDAP1

Gene location (Human)
Chr.	Chromosome 8 (human)
Band	8q21.11	Start	74,320,613 bp
Band	8q21.11	End	74,518,007 bp

Gene location (Mouse)
Chr.	Chromosome 1 (mouse)
Band	1|1 A3	Start	17,215,586 bp
Band	1|1 A3	End	17,234,495 bp
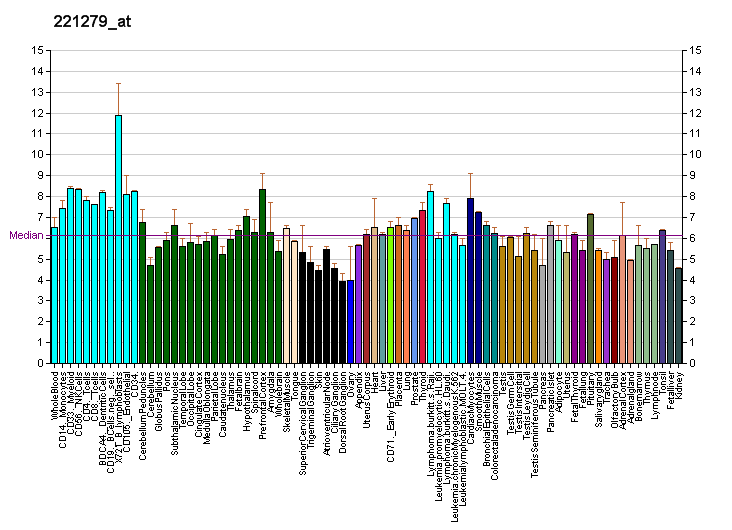
RNA expression pattern
Bgee	Human / Mouse (ortholog); Top expressed in: endothelial cell; secondary oocyte; Brodmann area 23; cerebellar vermis; postcentral gyrus; entorhinal cortex; pons; middle temporal gyrus; pars compacta; superior frontal gyrus / Top expressed in: barrel cortex; substantia nigra; zygote; ventral tegmental area; medial vestibular nucleus; pontine nuclei; secondary oocyte; dorsal tegmental nucleus; habenula; primary oocyte; More reference expression data
BioGPS	More reference expression data
Gene ontology
Molecular function	glutathione transferase activity
Cellular component	integral component of membrane; mitochondrial outer membrane; integral component of mitochondrial outer membrane; membrane; mitochondrion; nucleus; cytoplasm; cytosol
Biological process	mitochondrial fusion; protein targeting to mitochondrion; response to retinoic acid; mitochondrial fission; cellular response to vitamin D; glutathione metabolic process; mitochondrion organization
Sources:Amigo / QuickGO
Orthologs
Databases	NCBI: entry; OMA: entry
Species	Human	Mouse
Entrez	54332	14545
Ensembl	ENSG00000104381	ENSMUSG00000025777
UniProt	Q8TB36	O88741
RefSeq (mRNA)	NM_001040875; NM_018972; NM_001362929; NM_001362930; NM_001362931 NM_001362932	NM_010267
RefSeq (protein)	NP_001035808; NP_061845; NP_001349858; NP_001349859; NP_001349860 NP_001349861	NP_034397
Location (UCSC)	Chr 8: 74.32 – 74.52 Mb	Chr 1: 17.22 – 17.23 Mb
PubMed search
- Wikidata
View/Edit Human	View/Edit Mouse

Ganglioside-induced differentiation-associated protein 1 is a type of protein that in humans is encoded by the GDAP1 gene.

This gene encodes a member of the ganglioside-induced differentiation-associated protein family, which may play a role in a signal transduction pathway during neuronal development. Mutations in this gene have been associated with various forms of Charcot–Marie–Tooth disease and neuropathy.

Two transcript variants encoding different isoforms have been identified for this gene.
