= SH3TC2 =

Protein-coding gene in the species Homo sapiens

Identifiers
- Aliases: SH3TC2, CMT4C, MNMN, SH3 domain and tetratricopeptide repeats 2
- External IDs: OMIM: 608206; MGI: 2444417; GeneCards: SH3TC2

Gene location (Human)
Chr.	Chromosome 5 (human)
Band	5q32	Start	148,923,639 bp
Band	5q32	End	149,063,163 bp

Gene location (Mouse)
Chr.	Chromosome 18 (mouse)
Band	18|18 E1	Start	62,086,146 bp
Band	18|18 E1	End	62,157,473 bp
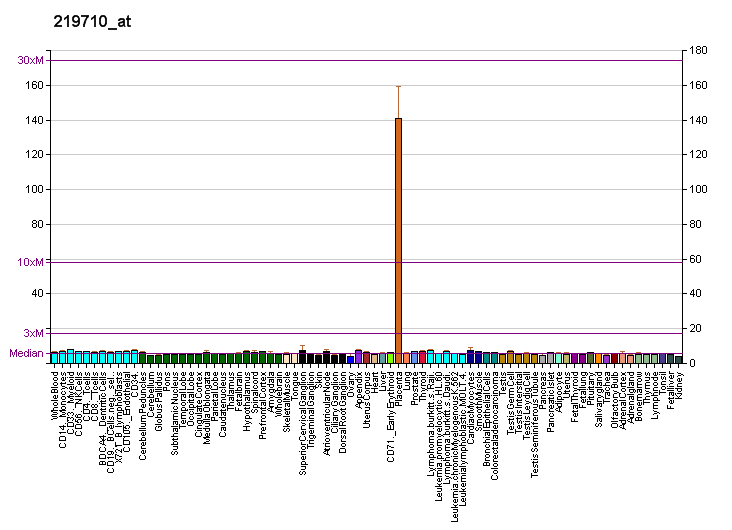

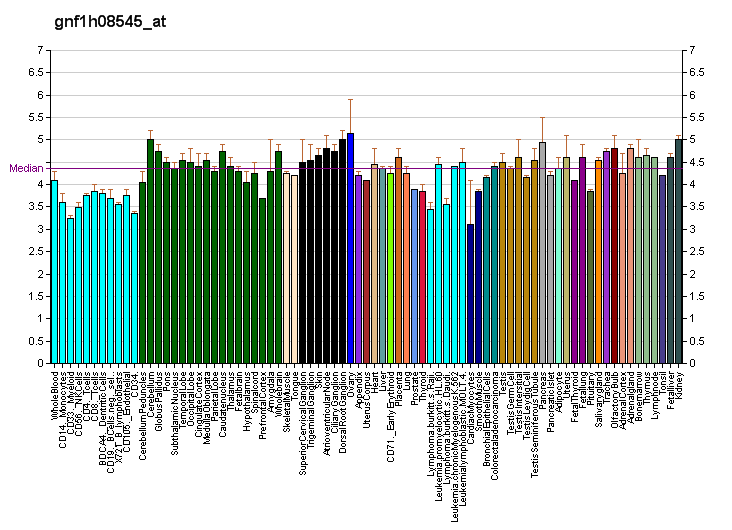
RNA expression pattern
Bgee	Human / Mouse (ortholog); Top expressed in: corpus callosum; sural nerve; C1 segment; internal globus pallidus; placenta; gonad; right testis; apex of heart; optic nerve; left testis / Top expressed in: otic vesicle; right kidney; sciatic nerve; urothelium; renal corpuscle; transitional epithelium of urinary bladder; vestibular membrane of cochlear duct; Gonadal ridge; human kidney; vestibular labyrinth; More reference expression data
BioGPS	More reference expression data
Orthologs
Databases	NCBI: entry; OMA: entry
Species	Human	Mouse
Entrez	79628	225608
Ensembl	ENSG00000169247	ENSMUSG00000045629
UniProt	Q8TF17	Q80VA5
RefSeq (mRNA)	NM_024577	NM_172628
RefSeq (protein)	NP_078853	NP_766216
Location (UCSC)	Chr 5: 148.92 – 149.06 Mb	Chr 18: 62.09 – 62.16 Mb
PubMed search
- Wikidata
View/Edit Human	View/Edit Mouse

SH3 domain and tetratricopeptide repeats-containing protein 2 is a protein that in humans is encoded by the SH3TC2 gene. It is believed to be expressed in the Schwann cells that wrap the myelin sheath around nerves.

== Function ==
This gene encodes a protein with two N-terminal Src homology 3 (SH3) domains and 10 tetratricopeptide repeat (TPR) motifs, and is a member of a small gene family. The gene product has been proposed to be an adapter or docking molecule.

The mouse version (orthologue) of SH3TC2 is believed to be expressed in Schwann cells. The tagged protein localizes to the plasma membrane and to the perinuclear endocytic recycling compartment. Mice lacking Sh3tc2 have an abnormal organization of the node of Ranvier consistent with the idea that the protein might have a role in myelination or in axon – glial cell interactions.

== Clinical significance ==
Mutations in SH3TC2 are known to cause the following conditions:

- Charcot-Marie-Tooth disease type 4C, an autosomal recessive childhood-onset neurodegenerative disease characterized by demyelination of motor and sensory neurons;
- Mononeuropathy of the median nerve (MNMN) at the wrist.
