= Howard Henry Tooth =

British neurologist

Howard Henry Tooth

Howard Henry Tooth CB CMG (1856–1925) was a British neurologist and one of the discoverers of Charcot–Marie–Tooth disease.

== Early life and education ==
Dr. Tooth was born on 22 April 1856 to Frederick Tooth of Hove, Sussex, England. He attended Rugby School and from there attended St John's College, Cambridge. In 1877, he graduated Bachelor of Arts and achieved Master of Arts in 1881.

After his university education, Howard Henry Tooth studied at St Bartholomew's Hospital, achieving his MD in 1885.

== Career ==
In 1887 became Physician at the Metropolitan Free Hospital. He was also appointed Assistant Physician in the same year at the National Hospital for the Paralysed and Epileptic and promoted to full Physician in 1907. He was also an assistant Physician at St Bartholomew's Hospital in 1895 and full Physician in 1906.

In 1894, he taught a post-graduate course on Cranial Nerves at the National Hospital for the Paralysed and Epileptic.

He was awarded CMG in 1901 and CB in 1918.

== Military service ==
Tooth spent quite a period of time in the military, resulting in his being awarded the rank of colonel. During the Boer War, he was stationed in South Africa.

Over the period of World War I he spent time both in London and as a consulting physician to the troops in Malta and consultant to the British forces in Italy. His services during this time resulted in his name's being twice mentioned in dispatches.

== Civic participation ==
Tooth was a member of the Pathological Society of London. In 1894, he served as a council member to that society.

== Personal life ==
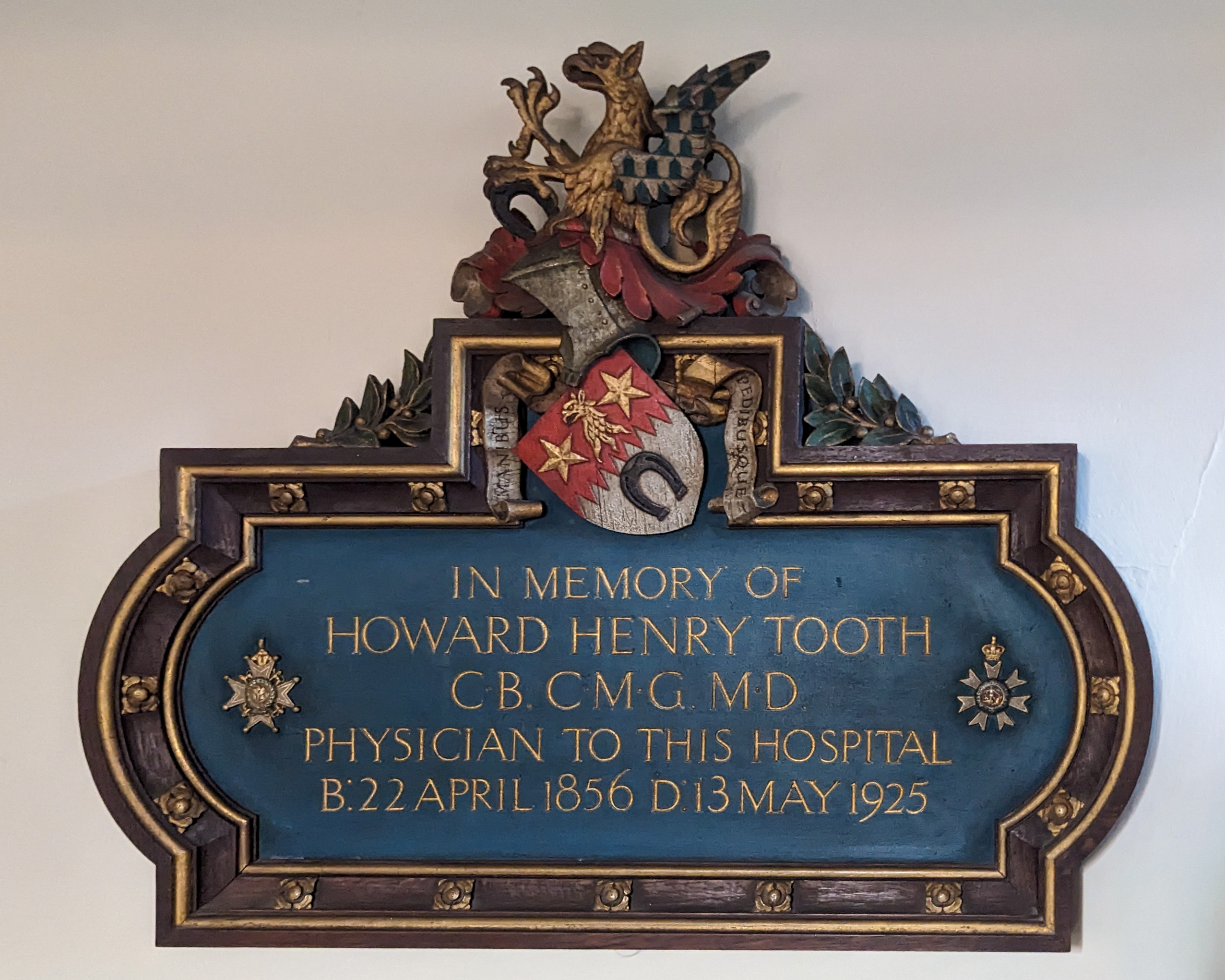
Memorial to Tooth in St Bartholomew-the-Less church

Tooth's first marriage was to Mary Beatrice Price, by whom he had one daughter. With his second wife, Helen Katherine Chilver, he had two sons and one daughter.

He died at home in Hadleigh, Suffolk, after a cerebral hemorrhage.

== Publications ==
In 1889 he delivered the Goulstonian Lecture to the Royal College of Physicians on the subject of "Secondary Degeneration of the Spinal Cord".
