= Myelin protein zero =

Protein found in humans

MPZ
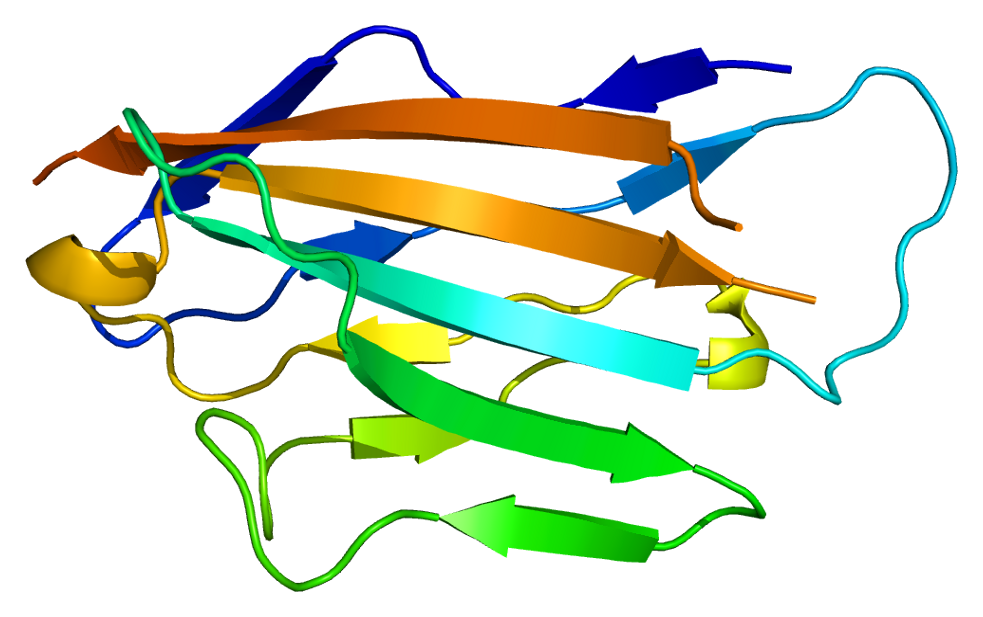

Identifiers
- Aliases: MPZ, CHM, CMT1, CMT1B, CMT2I, CMT2J, CMT4E, CMTDI3, CMTDID, DSS, HMSNIB, MPP, P0, myelin protein zero, CHN2
- External IDs: OMIM: 159440; MGI: 103177; GeneCards: MPZ
Available structures
PDB	Ortholog search: PDBe RCSB
PDB	List of PDB id codes 3OAI

Gene location (Human)
Chr.	Chromosome 1 (human)
Band	1q23.3	Start	161,304,735 bp
Band	1q23.3	End	161,309,968 bp

Gene location (Mouse)
Chr.	Chromosome 1 (mouse)
Band	1 H3|1 79.05 cM	Start	170,978,280 bp
Band	1 H3|1 79.05 cM	End	170,988,699 bp
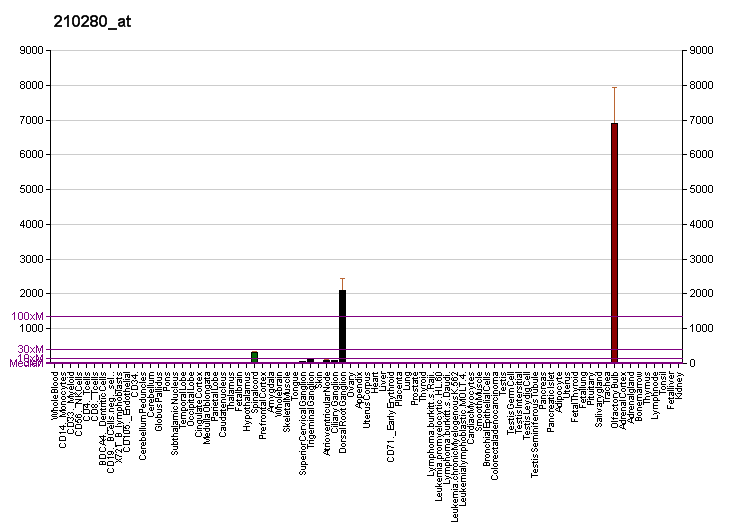
RNA expression pattern
Bgee	Human / Mouse (ortholog); Top expressed in: tibial nerve; sural nerve; olfactory bulb; trigeminal ganglion; spinal ganglia; muscle layer of sigmoid colon; left coronary artery; right auricle of heart; testicle; seminal vesicula / Top expressed in: somatic nerve plexus; lumbosacral plexus; sciatic nerve; utricle; ankle; lip; brachial plexus; vestibular sensory epithelium; esophagus; external carotid artery; More reference expression data
BioGPS	More reference expression data
Gene ontology
Molecular function	structural molecule activity
Cellular component	integral component of membrane; myelin sheath; rough endoplasmic reticulum; lysosome; basolateral plasma membrane; integral component of plasma membrane; membrane; plasma membrane
Biological process	negative regulation of apoptotic process; chemical synaptic transmission; myelination; cell-cell adhesion via plasma-membrane adhesion molecules; cell aggregation
Sources:Amigo / QuickGO
Orthologs
Databases	NCBI: entry; OMA: entry
Species	Human	Mouse
Entrez	4359	17528
Ensembl	ENSG00000158887	ENSMUSG00000056569
UniProt	P25189	P27573
RefSeq (mRNA)	NM_000530; NM_001315491	NM_008623; NM_001315499; NM_001315500
RefSeq (protein)	NP_000521; NP_001302420	NP_001302428; NP_001302429; NP_032649
Location (UCSC)	Chr 1: 161.3 – 161.31 Mb	Chr 1: 170.98 – 170.99 Mb
PubMed search
- Wikidata
View/Edit Human	View/Edit Mouse

Myelin protein zero (MPZ), also Myelin protein P0, is a single membrane glycoprotein which in humans is encoded by the MPZ gene. P0 is a major structural component of the myelin sheath in the peripheral nervous system (PNS). Myelin protein zero is expressed by Schwann cells and accounts for over 50% of all proteins in the peripheral nervous system, making it the most common protein expressed in the PNS. Mutations in myelin protein zero can cause myelin deficiency and are associated with neuropathies like Charcot–Marie–Tooth disease and Dejerine–Sottas disease.

== Structure ==
Myelin-PO_C
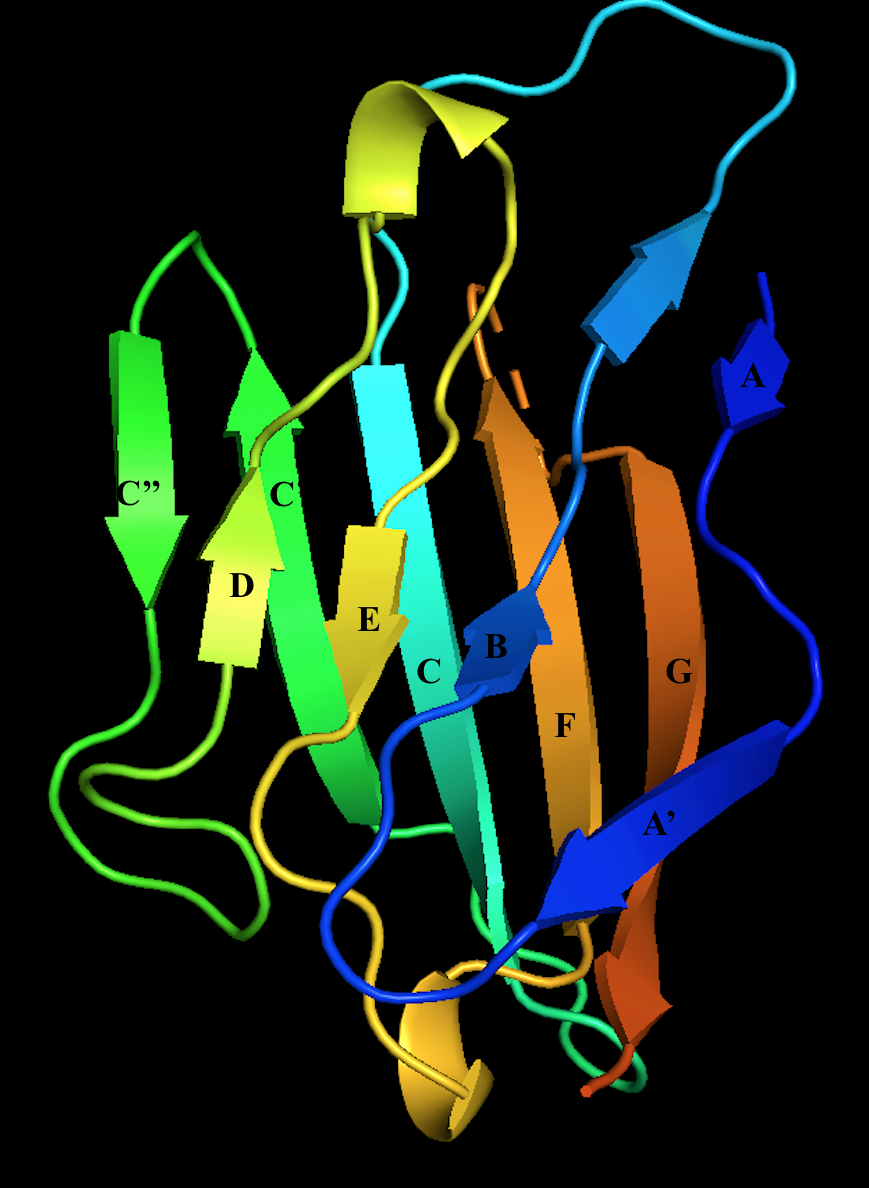
- Structure of myelin protein zero's extracellular domain with labelled beta strands. Strands D, E, B, and A make up one beta sheet, Strands A', G, F, C, C', C'' make up the other beta sheet.

Identifiers
- Symbol: Myelin-PO_C
- Pfam: PF10570
- InterPro: IPR019566
- OPM superfamily: 193
- OPM protein: 3oai
- Membranome: 213
Available protein structures:
- PDB: IPR019566 PF10570 (ECOD; PDBsum)
- AlphaFold: IPR019566; PF10570

In humans, the gene that encodes myelin protein zero is located on chromosome 1 near the Duffy locus or the Duffy antigen/chemokine receptor. The gene is about 7,000 bases long and is divided into 6 exons. In total, myelin protein zero is 219 amino acids long and has many basic amino acid residues.

Myelin protein zero consists of an extracellular N-terminal domain (amino acids 1–124), a single transmembrane region (125–150), and a smaller positively charged intracellular region (151–219). Its cytoplasmic domain is highly positively charged but presumably does not fold into a globular structure. The extracellular domain is structurally similar to the immunoglobulin domain and therefore the protein is considered as belonging to immunoglobulin superfamily.

Besides existing as a monomer, myelin protein zero is also known to form dimers and tetramers with other myelin protein zero molecules in vertebrates.

== Function ==
The myelin sheath is a multi-layered membrane, unique to the nervous system, that functions as an insulator to greatly increase the velocity of axonal impulse conduction. Myelin protein zero, absent in the central nervous system, is a major component of the myelin sheath in peripheral nerves. Mutations that disrupt the function of myelin protein zero can lead to less expression of myelin and degeneration of myelin sheath in the peripheral nervous system. Currently, myelin protein zero expression is postulated to be produced by signals from the axon. However, more details about the regulation of myelin protein zero are unknown.

It is postulated that myelin protein zero is a structural element in the formation and stabilization of peripheral nerve myelin. Myelin protein zero is also hypothesized to serve as a cell adhesion molecule, holding multiple layers of myelin together. When a myelinating cell wraps its membrane around an axon multiple times, generating multiple layers of myelin, myelin protein zero helps keep these sheets compact by serving as a "glue" that keeps the layers of myelin together. It does so by holding its characteristic coil structure together by the electrostatic interactions of its positively charged intracellular domain with acidic lipids in the cytoplasmic face of the opposite bilayer. and by interaction between hydrophobic globular 'heads' of adjacent extracellular domains.

Myelin protein zero's function is similar to the function of other proteins with immunoglobin domains like polyimmunoglobin and T4 protein. These proteins function as binding and adhesion molecules and participate in homotypic interactions, or interactions that involve two similar proteins. Myelin protein zero holds together the myelin sheath by participating in homotypic interactions with other myelin protein zero proteins. Myelin protein zero's extracellular domain binds to the myelin sphingolipid membrane and holds together myelin layers using homotypic interactions with other myelin protein zero extracellular domains, and with extracellular tryptophan residues interacting with the membrane.

Myelin protein zero has also been demonstrated to interact with other proteins like peripheral myelin protein 22. However, at this point the purpose of these interactions has not yet been determined.

== Associations with neuropathy ==
Mutations in myelin protein zero are known to cause myelin degeneration and neuropathy. Mutations that reduce myelin protein zero's adhesion function or its ability to participate in homeotypic interactions with other myelin protein zero proteins are thought to cause neuropathy. Mutations to myelin protein zero can lead to issues with the development of myelin early on in life or myelin degeneration on the axon later on in life. Some mutations can cause neuropathy in infancy like Derjerine–Sottas disease while other mutations can cause neuropathy within the first two decades of life like Charcot–Marie–Tooth disease. Adding a charged amino acid or changing a cysteine residue in the extracellular membrane can lead to neuropathy onset early on. Truncating the cytoplasmic domain or changing the tertiary structure of myelin protein zero can also result in neuropathy because the cytoplasmic domain has been demonstrated to be necessary for homotypic interactions.
