= CMTX3 =

Protein-coding gene in humans

Identifiers
- Aliases: CMTX3, Charcot-Marie-Tooth neuropathy, X-linked 3 (dominant)
- External IDs: GeneCards: CMTX3
Orthologs
Databases	NCBI: entry
Species	Human	Mouse
Entrez	1254	n/a
Ensembl	n/a	n/a
UniProt	n a	n/a
RefSeq (mRNA)	n/a	n/a
RefSeq (protein)	n/a	n/a
Location (UCSC)	n/a	n/a
PubMed search		n/a
- Wikidata
View/Edit Human

Charcot-Marie-Tooth neuropathy, X-linked 3 (dominant) is a protein that, in humans, is encoded by the CMTX3 gene.
