= GNB4 =

Protein-coding gene in the species Homo sapiens

Identifiers
- Aliases: GNB4, CMTD1F, G protein subunit beta 4, HG2B
- External IDs: OMIM: 610863; MGI: 104581; GeneCards: GNB4

Gene location (Human)
Chr.	Chromosome 3 (human)
Band	3q26.33	Start	179,396,088 bp
Band	3q26.33	End	179,451,476 bp

Gene location (Mouse)
Chr.	Chromosome 3 (mouse)
Band	3|3 A3	Start	32,634,481 bp
Band	3|3 A3	End	32,670,734 bp
RNA expression pattern
Bgee	Human / Mouse (ortholog); Top expressed in: skin of arm; secondary oocyte; skin of thigh; tibia; skin of hip; visceral pleura; parietal pleura; synovial membrane; saphenous vein; trigeminal ganglion / Top expressed in: semi-lunar valve; ascending aorta; lumbar spinal ganglion; aortic valve; dermis; primary oocyte; vas deferens; tunica media of zone of aorta; superior cervical ganglion; yolk sac; More reference expression data
BioGPS	n/a
Gene ontology
Molecular function	protein-containing complex binding; signal transducer activity
Cellular component	myelin sheath; lysosomal membrane; extracellular exosome; cytosol
Biological process	cellular response to glucagon stimulus; substantia nigra development; signal transduction; protein folding
Sources:Amigo / QuickGO
Orthologs
Databases	NCBI: entry; OMA: entry
Species	Human	Mouse
Entrez	59345	14696
Ensembl	ENSG00000114450	ENSMUSG00000027669
UniProt	Q9HAV0	P29387
RefSeq (mRNA)	NM_021629	NM_013531; NM_001348062; NM_001348104; NM_001348105
RefSeq (protein)	NP_067642	NP_038559; NP_001334991; NP_001335033; NP_001335034
Location (UCSC)	Chr 3: 179.4 – 179.45 Mb	Chr 3: 32.63 – 32.67 Mb
PubMed search
- Wikidata
View/Edit Human	View/Edit Mouse

Guanine nucleotide-binding protein subunit beta-4 is a protein that in humans is encoded by the GNB4 gene.

Heterotrimeric guanine nucleotide-binding proteins (G proteins), which integrate signals between receptors and effector proteins, are composed of an alpha, a beta, and a gamma subunit. These subunits are encoded by families of related genes. This gene encodes a beta subunit. Beta subunits are important regulators of alpha subunits, as well as of certain signal transduction receptors and effectors.
