= Charcot–Marie–Tooth disease =

Neuromuscular disease

- Other names: Charcot–Marie–Tooth neuropathy, peroneal muscular atrophy, Dejerine–Sottas syndrome
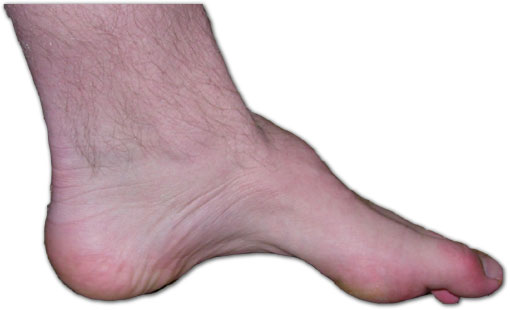
- The foot of a person with Charcot–Marie–Tooth disease: the lack of muscle, a high arch, and claw toes are signs of this genetic disease.
- Specialty: Neurology, podiatry, orthopedics, physical medicine and rehabilitation
- Symptoms: common: high-arched feet, hammertoe, foot drop, high-stepping gait, weakness, stiffness, and muscle wasting of lower legs, arm, and hands, and reduced tendon reflexes. sometimes: flat-arched feet, spinal deformities.
- Usual onset: childhood – early adulthood
- Duration: lifelong
- Causes: family history (genetics)
- Risk factors: family history (genetics)
- Diagnostic method: genetic testing, nerve conduction study or electromyogram (EMG)
- Differential diagnosis: muscular dystrophy
- Treatment: management to maintain function
- Prognosis: progressive
- Frequency: prevalence: 1 in 2,500

Charcot–Marie–Tooth disease (CMT; /ʃɑːrˈkoʊ məˈriː ˈtuːθ/, shar-KOE ma-REE TOOTH), also known as hereditary motor and sensory neuropathy (HMSN), is an inherited neurological disorder that affects the peripheral nerves responsible for transmitting signals between the brain, spinal cord, and the rest of the body.

It is the most common inherited neuropathy that causes sensory and motor symptoms of numbness, tingling, weakness and muscle atrophy, pain, and progressive foot deformities over time. In some cases, CMT also affects nerves controlling automatic bodily functions like sweating and balance. Symptoms typically start in the feet and legs before spreading to the hands and arms. While some individuals experience minimal symptoms, others may face significant physical limitations. There is no cure for CMT; however, treatments such as physical therapy, orthopedic devices, surgery, and medications can help manage symptoms and improve quality of life.

CMT is caused by mutations in over 100 different genes, which disrupt the function of nerve cells' axons (responsible for transmitting signals) and their myelin sheaths (which insulate and accelerate signal transmission). When these components are damaged, nerve signal transmission slows down or becomes impaired, leading to problems with muscle control and sensory feedback. The condition was discovered in 1886 by doctors Jean-Martin Charcot and Pierre Marie of France and the English neurologist Howard Henry Tooth.

This disease is the most commonly inherited peripheral neuropathy, affecting approximately one in 2,500 people.

== Signs and symptoms ==
The symptoms of CMT often appear in childhood and adolescence, but in some cases, they may not develop until adulthood. The severity and progression of symptoms can vary widely between individuals even among members of the same family. Some people do not experience symptoms until their early 30s or 40s. The most common early sign of CMT is difficulty walking, often due to weakness in the muscles of the lower legs and feet. This muscle weakness can lead to foot drop, where patients have trouble lifting the front part of the foot, causing them to trip or adopt a high-stepping gait. Over time, individuals may develop distinctive foot deformities, such as high arches (known as pes cavus) and curled toes (hammertoes), due to muscle imbalance.

As the disease progresses, the weakness often spreads to the hands and forearms, making tasks that require fine motor skills—like buttoning a shirt or writing—more difficult. In addition to motor symptoms, many people with CMT also experience a gradual loss of sensation in the feet, legs, hands, and arms. This sensory loss may affect the ability to feel pain, temperature, or touch, and can lead to problems with balance, especially in low-light conditions.

Symptoms and progression of the disease can vary. Involuntary grinding of teeth and squinting are prevalent and often go unnoticed by the person affected. Breathing can be affected in some, as can hearing, vision, and neck and shoulder muscles. Scoliosis is common, causing hunching and loss of height. Hip sockets can be malformed. Gastrointestinal problems can be part of CMT, as can difficulty chewing, swallowing, and speaking (due to atrophy of vocal cords). A tremor can develop as muscles waste. Pregnancy has been known to exacerbate CMT, as well as severe emotional stress. Patients with CMT must avoid periods of prolonged immobility, such as when recovering from a secondary injury, as prolonged periods of limited mobility can drastically accelerate symptoms of CMT.

Pain is a common symptom experienced by individuals with Charcot–Marie–Tooth disease, often resulting from postural abnormalities, skeletal deformities, muscle fatigue, and cramping. This pain can typically be managed through a combination of physical therapy, orthopedic interventions, and the use of corrective or assistive devices. In cases where these approaches do not provide sufficient relief, analgesic medications may be necessary to alleviate discomfort and improve quality of life.

Although the disease is typically slowly progressive and not life-threatening, the degree of disability can vary. Some people may live relatively normal lives with mild symptoms, while others may require orthopedic supports, physical therapy, or even surgery to manage complications.

The variation in symptoms and severity is influenced by the specific genetic mutation causing the condition. While some genes are linked to earlier onset and more severe forms of CMT, others result in milder forms with slower progression. Furthermore, even when the same gene is involved, the symptoms can differ between individuals.

Neuropathic pain is a recognized symptom of Charcot–Marie–Tooth disease, although its presence and severity can vary greatly among individuals, and not all patients experience pain. For some, it can be moderate to severe and significantly interfere with daily activities and overall quality of life. When it presents, the pain experienced in CMT is often similar in character to that observed in other forms of peripheral neuropathy, including postherpetic neuralgia and complex regional pain syndrome. Addressing this symptom typically requires an individualized treatment plan, which may include pharmacological interventions, physical therapy, and other supportive strategies to manage and alleviate discomfort.

Charcot–Marie–Tooth disease type 1A (CMT1A) can also include mild enlargement or hypertrophy of leg muscles, particularly the calves, alongside typical symptoms of distal muscle weakness and atrophy. However, this muscle enlargement typically represents pseudohypertrophy due to fatty tissue infiltration rather than actual muscle growth.

This hypertrophic type of CMT is not caused by the muscles enlarging directly, but by pseudohypertrophy of the legs as fatty tissue enters the leg muscles.

== Causes and genetics ==
Chromosome 17

Charcot–Marie–Tooth (CMT) disease is an inherited neurological disorder primarily caused by genetic mutations that disrupt critical proteins within peripheral nerves. These mutations predominantly affect proteins essential for the structure and function of the myelin sheath, including peripheral myelin protein 22 (PMP22), myelin protein zero (P0/MPZ), connexin32 (Cx32/GJB1), and periaxin (PRX), leading to demyelination. Additionally, mutations in proteins involved in axonal integrity, such as neurofilament light chain (NF-L), dynamin 2 (DNM2), ganglioside-induced differentiation-associated protein 1 (GDAP1), and Mitofusin-2 (MFN2), can cause axonal forms of CMT. Due to the close interaction between Schwann cells (which produce myelin) and axons, mutations affecting Schwann cells often result in secondary axonal degeneration, further complicating disease progression. Ultimately, the pathogenesis of CMT involves the disruption of essential cellular processes, including protein synthesis, sorting, intracellular transport, protein degradation, and mitochondrial function, highlighting the complex molecular mechanisms underlying this disorder.

Chromosome 17 and 1 Causes of Charcot–Marie–Tooth (CMT) Disease:
Chromosome	Gene involved	Explanation
17	PMP22	The most common cause (70–80% of cases) of CMT is a duplication on the short arm of chromosome 17, involving the gene PMP22. This duplication leads to an excess of PMP22 protein, disrupting the normal structure and function of the myelin sheath
1	MFN2	Mutations affecting the gene MFN2, located on chromosome 1, impair the function of mitochondrial proteins. Mutated MFN2 causes mitochondria to form clusters or aggregates, restricting their movement along axons toward synapses, and thus impairing synaptic function.

In some forms like X-linked CMT (CMTX), mutations in the GJB1 gene lead to dysfunction in gap junctions within Schwann cells, further impairing nerve signal transmission.

== Classification ==
Charcot–Marie–Tooth (CMT) disease is a genetically heterogeneous disorder, meaning that it can be caused by mutations in many different genes.

To date, dozens of genes have been linked to various forms of CMT, reflecting the complexity of its molecular basis. As a result, CMT is classified into several major types, such as CMT1, CMT2, CMT4, CMTX, and intermediate forms, based on the pattern of inheritance and whether the primary defect affects the myelin sheath or the axon. CMT1 involves demyelination and is most caused by duplication of the PMP22 gene, while CMT2 is primarily axonal and frequently linked to mutations in genes such as MFN2 or NEFL. X-linked and autosomal recessive forms, like CMTX and CMT4, are also recognized and often associated with more severe or early-onset symptoms.

Each type is further divided into subtypes, defined by the specific gene that is mutated. This genetic classification helps guide diagnosis, prognosis, and, potentially, the development of targeted therapies.

=== GARS1-related axonal neuropathy (CMT2) ===
Charcot–Marie–Tooth type 2 (CMT2) is commonly classified as an axonal neuropathy due to the degeneration of nerve axons observed in affected individuals. Unlike CMT type 1, which results from damage to the myelin sheath, CMT type 2 is characterized by direct injury to the axon itself. This axonal damage can disrupt nerve signal transmission between the brain and muscles, resulting in symptoms such as muscle weakness, atrophy, reduced sensation, and foot deformities. The onset of symptoms in CMT2 typically occurs between the ages of 5 and 25.

CMT2D is one of more than 31 recognized subtypes of Charcot–Marie–Tooth disease type 2 (CMT2) and is diagnosed when both motor and sensory deficits are present—such as loss of sensation caused by degeneration of sensory axons. In cases where only motor symptoms are observed without sensory involvement, the condition is classified as distal hereditary motor neuropathy type V (dHMN-V). The reason behind the variability in sensory involvement among patients with GARS1-related neuropathy remains unclear.

Symptoms of CMT2D typically include muscle weakness, loss of sensation, reduced reflexes, and muscle atrophy, which are similar to those seen in both CMT1 and other CMT2 variants. The severity and combination of symptoms vary widely among patients, particularly regarding the extent of sensory involvement.

CMT2D is a result of autosomal dominant mutations in the human GARS1 gene located at 7p14.3 and is thought to be caused by aberrant gain-of-function missense mutations.

The GARS1 gene encodes the enzyme glycyl-tRNA synthetase (GlyRS), which belongs to the class II group of aminoacyl-tRNA synthetases. This enzyme is essential in the process of protein synthesis, facilitating the bonding of the amino acid glycine to its corresponding transfer RNA (tRNA). Through this process, GlyRS ensures the accurate incorporation of glycine during translation, making it essential for proper protein production.

Many different mutations have been found in CMT2D patients, and how mutations in GARS1 cause CMT2D remains unclear. However, mutant glycyl-tRNA synthetase (GlyRS) is thought to interfere with transmembrane receptors, causing motor disease, and that mutations in the gene could disrupt the ability of GlyRS to interact with its cognate RNA, disrupting protein production. The GARS1 mutations present in CMT2D cause a deficient amount of glycyl-tRNA in cells, preventing the elongation phase of protein synthesis. Elongation is a key step in protein production, so when a deficiency of glycyl-tRNA exists, protein synthesis is unable to continue at glycine sites. GARS1 mutations also stall initiation of translation due to a stress response that is induced by glycine addition failure. By stalling elongation and initiation of translation, CMT2D mutations in GARS1 cause translational repression, meaning that overall translation is inhibited.

GARS1-associated axonal neuropathy is a progressive condition that deteriorates over time. Although the precise mechanisms driving the chronic neurodegeneration caused by mutant glycyl-tRNA synthetase (GlyRS) remain unclear, one proposed theory involves disrupted vascular endothelial growth factor (VEGF) signaling. The mutant GlyRS aberrantly interacts with neuronal transmembrane receptors, such as Neuropilin-1 (Nrp1) and VEGF receptors, interfering with normal signaling pathways and contributing to the development of neuropathy.

GARS-CMT2D mutations alter GlyRS and allow it to bind to the Nrp1 receptor, interfering with the normal binding of Nrp1 to VEGF. While enhanced expression of VEGF improves motor function, reduced expression of Nrp1 worsens CMT2D; because Nrp1 binds to mutant GlyRS in mutant GARS1-CMT2D individuals, Nrp1 expression is reduced, in turn worsening motor function. Mice with deficient VEGF demonstrate motor neuron disease over time. Thus, the VEGF/Nrp1 pathway is considered to be targetable for CMT2D treatment.

=== X-linked CMT ===
CMT can also be produced by X-linked mutations, in which case it is called X-linked CMT (CMTX). In CMTX, mutated connexons create nonfunctional gap junctions that interrupt molecular exchange and signal transport. The mutation can appear in the GJB1 gene coding for the connexin 32 protein, a gap junction protein expressed in Schwann cells. Because this protein is also present in oligodendrocytes, demyelination can appear in the CNS as well.

Schwann cells create the myelin sheath by wrapping their plasma membranes around the axon. These Schwann cells work together with neurons and fibroblasts to create a functional nerve. Schwann cells and neurons exchange molecular signals by way of gap junctions that regulate survival and differentiation.

Demyelinating Schwann cells cause abnormal axon structure and function. They may cause axon degeneration, or they may simply cause axons to malfunction. The myelin sheath allows nerve cells to conduct signals faster. When the myelin sheath is damaged, however, nerve signals are slower. This can be measured by a common neurological test, electromyography. When the axon is damaged, the result is a reduced compound muscle action potential.

== Diagnosis ==
Charcot–Marie–Tooth (CMT) disease can be diagnosed using a combination of three primary methods: nerve conduction studies, nerve biopsy, and genetic testing. Nerve conduction studies assess the velocity of electrical impulses traveling through nerves, whereas nerve biopsy entails the examination of small samples of nerve tissue. Genetic testing can conclusively diagnose CMT by identifying specific known mutations linked to the condition, though not all genetic markers for CMT are currently known. Initial signs of CMT often include lower-leg weakness, such as foot drop, and foot deformities like high arches or hammertoes. However, these symptoms alone do not provide enough information for a diagnosis. Individuals showing signs of CMT should be referred to a neurologist or rehabilitation medicine specialist for further evaluation and treatment. During a physical examination, the physician may assess muscle strength such as asking the patient to walk on their heels or resist applied pressure on their legs and check for sensory loss and reduced deep-tendon reflexes, such as the knee-jerk response. A detailed family history is also important, as CMT is an inherited condition. While the absence of a family history does not rule out CMT, it can help the physician distinguish it from other causes of neuropathy, such as diabetes, toxin exposure, or certain medications.

== Treatment and management ==
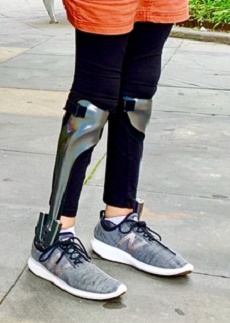
Ankle-foot orthosis

There is no cure for CMT, but its symptoms can be managed to maintain quality of life. Although no proven treatment can alter disease progression, physical and occupational therapy can help preserve muscle strength, flexibility, and mobility.

Orthopedic devices like ankle-foot orthoses (AFOs) are commonly used to correct foot drop and improve gait. In some cases, surgical interventions may be necessary to straighten toes, lower arches, or fuse joints to enhance stability. Pain management may involve physical therapy, assistive devices, or medications for neuropathic pain. Drugs with gabapentin and pregabalin may be used for neuropathic pain. NSAIDs and SSRIs are also used for non-neuropathic pain related to skeletal deformities caused by CMT. Treadmill training in patients has especially been shown to improve symptoms associated with impaired walking and balancing over time. Strength training paired with creatine supplements can also help as it may compensate for weak distal muscles and help alleviate CMT-related chronic fatigue. Certain drugs, such as vincristine (a chemotherapy agent), should be avoided altogether in CMT patients due to their known toxicity to nerves. Regular follow-up with healthcare providers is essential to adapt care as the disease progresses.

== History ==
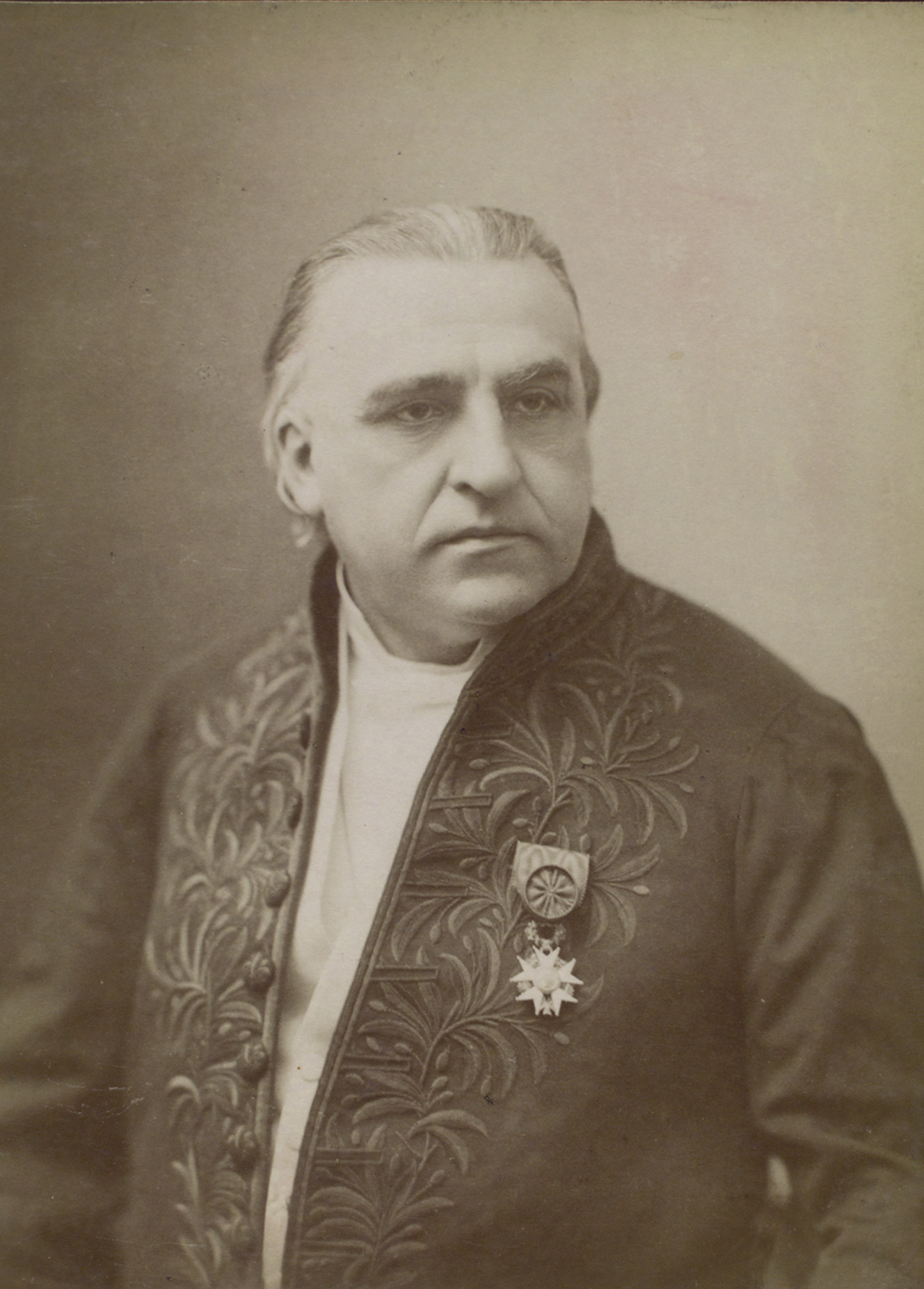
Jean-Martin Charcot

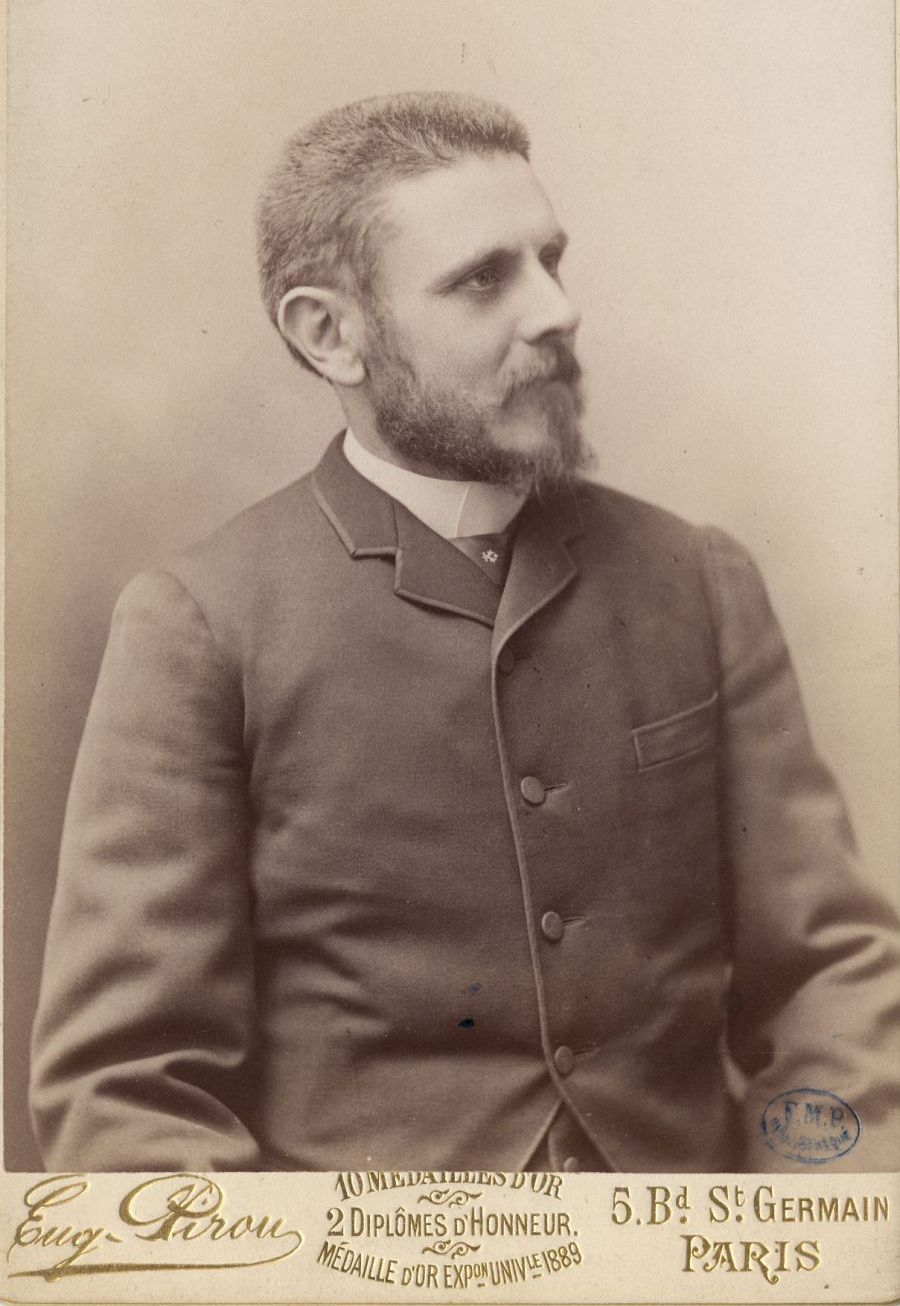
Pierre Marie

Howard Henry Tooth

Charcot–Marie–Tooth disease was first discovered in 1886 by three scientists: Jean-Martin Charcot (1825–1893) and his assistant Pierre Marie (1853–1940), along with the English doctor Howard Henry Tooth (1856–1925). In their original publication, titled “Concerning a Special Form of Progressive Muscular Atrophy,” Charcot and Marie acknowledged that similar cases had been previously published in medical literature.

Their findings described hereditary neuropathy, marked by gradual muscle wasting and diminished sensation in the extremities. This crucial discovery helped establish CMT as a distinct clinical entity, differentiating it from other neuromuscular conditions such as muscular dystrophies. Over the years, advancements in neurogenetics have led to the identification of various genetic mutations responsible for the disease, significantly enhancing our understanding of its pathogenesis and classification.

Charcot also noted that prior descriptions of the disease were neither objective nor thorough. Most of the earlier accounts merely mentioned that CMT was hereditary. As a result, Charcot felt it was essential to provide a comprehensive description of the disease, ensuring that it received the attention it deserved.

In 2010, Charcot–Marie–Tooth (CMT) disease became one of the first conditions in which the precise genetic cause was identified in an individual patient using whole-genome sequencing. This groundbreaking discovery was made by scientists affiliated with the Charcot–Marie–Tooth Association (CMTA). The analysis revealed two mutations in the SH3TC2 gene, which is already known to be associated with CMT. To better understand the inheritance pattern, researchers compared the genome of the affected individual with those of the patient's parents and seven siblings—some of whom had the disease and others who did not. Both parents were found to carry one normal and one mutated copy of the SH3TC2 gene and showed either mild or no symptoms. However, children who inherited two mutated copies of the gene exhibited the full clinical features of the disease.

== Public figures with CMT ==
- US country music singer Alan Jackson. Jackson was definitively diagnosed in his early 50s.
- US actor Julie Newmar. She played the original Catwoman in the 1960s Batman television series.
- US Paralympic cyclist Anthony Zahn. He won a bronze medal at the 2008 Beijing Paralympic Games.
- Jamaica and US fashion designer Rachel Scott, who serves as Creative Director of Proenza Schouler.
- UK cultural and disability studies academic Professor George McKay. His books include Shakin' All Over: Popular Music and Disability (2014).
- US Paralympic swimmer Jamal Hill, bronze medallist at the Tokyo 2021 Paralympic Games.
- US actress Isabelle Tate was reported to have died of a rare variant of the disease in 2025.
- Irish Paralympic cyclist Eoghan Clifford.
- US filmmaker and playwright Crystal R. Emery. Known for directing the 2010 documentary The Deadliest Disease in America.
- Australian wheelchair tennis player Jin Woodman (born 2009)
- American itinerant preacher David Miller (1946–2024)

== See also ==
- Charcot–Marie–Tooth disease classifications
- Christina's World – 1948 painting by Andrew Wyeth
- Hereditary motor and sensory neuropathies
- Hereditary motor neuropathies
- Low copy repeats
- Palmoplantar keratoderma and spastic paraplegia
