= List of neurological conditions and disorders =

This is a list of major and frequently observed neurological disorders (e.g., Alzheimer's disease), symptoms (e.g., back pain), signs (e.g., aphasia) and syndromes (e.g., Aicardi syndrome). There is disagreement over the definitions and criteria used to delineate various disorders and whether some of these conditions should be classified as mental disorders or in other ways.

== # ==
- 22q13 deletion syndrome

== A ==
- Abulia
- Achromatopsia
- Acquired brain injury
- Acute flaccid myelitis
- Agraphia
- Agnosia
- Aicardi syndrome
- AIDS – neurological manifestations
- Akinetopsia
- Alexander Disease
- Alien hand syndrome
- Allan–Herndon–Dudley syndrome
- Alternating hemiplegia of childhood
- Alzheimer's disease
- Amaurosis fugax
- Amnesia
- Amyotrophic lateral sclerosis
- Anencephaly
- Aneurysm
- Angelman syndrome
- Anosognosia
- Aphasia
- Aphantasia
- Apraxia
- Arachnoiditis
- Arnold–Chiari malformation
- Asomatognosia
- Asperger syndrome
- Ataxia
- ATR-16 syndrome
- Attention deficit hyperactivity disorder
- Attention deficit hyperactivity disorder predominately inattentive
- Auditory processing disorder
- Autism spectrum disorder

== B ==
- Back pain
- Behçet's disease
- Bell's palsy
- Bipolar disorder
- Blindsight
- Blindness
- Blurred vision
- Brain damage
- Brachial plexus injury
- Brain death
- Brain injury
- Brain infarction
- Brain tumor
- Brody myopathy

== C ==
- Canavan disease
- Capgras delusion
- Carpal tunnel syndrome
- Causalgia
- Central pain syndrome
- Central pontine myelinolysis
- Centronuclear myopathy
- Cephalic disorder
- Cerebral aneurysm
- Cerebral arteriosclerosis
- Cerebral atrophy
- Cerebral autosomal dominant arteriopathy with subcortical infarcts and leukoencephalopathy
- Cerebral dysgenesis–neuropathy–ichthyosis–keratoderma syndrome
- Cerebral gigantism
- Cerebral palsy
- Cerebral vasculitis
- Cerebrospinal fluid leak
- Cervical spinal stenosis
- Charcot–Marie–Tooth disease
- Chiari malformation
- Chorea
- Chronic fatigue syndrome
- Chronic inflammatory demyelinating polyneuropathy
- Charles bonnet syndrome
- Chronic pain
- Cluster headache
- Cockayne syndrome
- Coffin–Lowry syndrome
- Coma
- Complex post-traumatic stress disorder
- Complex regional pain syndrome
- Compression neuropathy
- Congenital distal spinal muscular atrophy
- Congenital facial diplegia
- Color blindness
- Cornelia de Lange syndrome
- Corticobasal degeneration
- Cotard delusion
- Cranial arteritis
- Craniosynostosis
- Creutzfeldt–Jakob disease
- Cumulative trauma disorders
- Cushing's syndrome
- Cyclic vomiting syndrome
- Cyclothymic disorder
- Cytomegalic inclusion body disease
- Cytomegalovirus Infection

== D ==
- Dandy–Walker syndrome
- Dawson disease
- De Morsier's syndrome
- Dejerine–Klumpke palsy
- Dejerine–Sottas disease
- Delayed sleep phase disorder or syndrome
- Dementia
- Dermatillomania
- Dermatomyositis
- Developmental coordination disorder
- Diabetic neuropathy
- Disc herniation
- Diffuse sclerosis
- Diplopia
- Disorders of consciousness
- Distal hereditary motor neuropathy type V
- Distal spinal muscular atrophy type 1
- Distal spinal muscular atrophy type 2
- Dizziness
- Down syndrome
- Dravet syndrome
- Duchenne muscular dystrophy
- Dysarthria
- Dysautonomia
- Dyscalculia
- Dysphagia
- Dysgraphia
- Dyskinesia
- Dyslexia
- Dystonia

== E ==
- Empty sella syndrome
- Encephalitis
- Encephalocele
- Encephalopathy
- Encephalotrigeminal angiomatosis
- Encopresis
- Enuresis
- Epilepsy
- Epilepsy-intellectual disability in females
- Erb's palsy
- Erythromelalgia
- Essential tremor
- Exploding head syndrome

== F ==
- Fabry's disease
- Fahr's syndrome
- Fainting
- Familial spastic paralysis
- Fatal insomnia
- Fetal alcohol syndrome
- Febrile seizures
- Fisher syndrome
- Fibromyalgia
- Foville's syndrome
- Fragile X syndrome
- Fragile X-associated tremor/ataxia syndrome
- Friedreich's ataxia
- Frontotemporal dementia
- Functional neurological symptom disorder

== G ==
- Gaucher's disease
- Generalized anxiety disorder
- Generalized epilepsy with febrile seizures plus
- Gerstmann's syndrome
- Giant cell arteritis
- Giant cell inclusion disease
- Globoid cell leukodystrophy
- Gray matter heterotopia
- Guillain–Barré syndrome

== H ==
- Head injury
- Headache
- Hemicrania Continua
- Hemifacial spasm
- Hemispatial neglect
- Hereditary motor neuropathies
- Hereditary spastic paraplegia
- Heredopathia atactica polyneuritiformis
- Herpes zoster
- Herpes zoster oticus
- Hirayama syndrome
- Hirschsprung's disease
- Holmes–Adie syndrome
- Holoprosencephaly
- Hopkins syndrome
- HTLV-1 associated myelopathy
- Huntington's disease
- Hydrocephalia
- Hydranencephaly
- Hydrocephalus
- Hypercortisolism
- Hypoalgesia
- Hypoesthesia
- Hypoxia

== I ==
- Immune-mediated encephalomyelitis
- Inclusion body myositis
- Incontinentia pigmenti
- Infantile spasms
- Inflammatory myopathy
- Intellectual disability
- Intracranial cyst
- Intracranial hypertension
- Isodicentric 15

== J ==
- Joubert syndrome

== K ==
- Karak syndrome
- Kearns–Sayre syndrome
- KIF1A-Associated Neurological Disorder (KAND)
- Kinsbourne syndrome
- Kleine–Levin syndrome
- Klippel Feil syndrome
- Krabbe disease
- Korsakoff Syndrome
- Kufor–Rakeb syndrome
- Kugelberg–Welander disease – see Spinal muscular atrophy

== L ==
- Lafora disease
- Lambert–Eaton myasthenic syndrome
- Landau–Kleffner syndrome
- Lateral medullary (Wallenberg) syndrome
- Learning disabilities
- Leigh's disease
- Lennox–Gastaut syndrome
- Lesch–Nyhan syndrome
- Leukodystrophy
- Leukoencephalopathy with vanishing white matter
- Lewy body dementia
- Lissencephaly
- Locked-in syndrome
- Lou Gehrig's disease – see Amyotrophic lateral sclerosis
- Lumbar disc disease
- Lumbar hernia
- Lumbar spinal stenosis
- Lupus erythematosus – neurological sequelae
- Lyme disease

== M ==
- Machado–Joseph disease
- Macrencephaly
- Macrocephalia
- Macropsia
- Mal de debarquement
- Megalencephalic leukoencephalopathy with subcortical cysts
- Megalencephaly
- Melkersson–Rosenthal syndrome
- Menieres disease
- Meningitis
- Menkes disease
- Metachromatic leukodystrophy
- Microcephaly
- Micropsia
- Migraine
- Mild brain injury
- Miller Fisher syndrome
- Mini-stroke (transient ischemic attack)
- Misophonia
- Mitochondrial myopathy
- Mobius syndrome
- Monomelic amyotrophy
- Morvan syndrome
- Motor neurone disease – see Amyotrophic lateral sclerosis
- Motor skills disorder
- Moyamoya disease
- Mucopolysaccharidoses
- Multifocal motor neuropathy
- Multi-infarct dementia
- Multiple sclerosis
- Multiple system atrophy
- Muscular dystrophy
- Myalgic encephalomyelitis
- Myasthenia gravis
- Myelinoclastic diffuse sclerosis
- Myoclonic Encephalopathy of infants
- Myoclonus
- Myopathy
- Myotonia congenita
- Myotubular myopathy

== N ==
- Narcolepsy
- Neuralgia
- Neuro-Behçet's disease
- Neurofibromatosis
- Neuroleptic malignant syndrome
- Neuromyotonia
- Neuronal ceroid lipofuscinosis
- Neuronal migration disorders
- Neuropathy
- Neurosis
- Niemann–Pick disease
- Non-24-hour sleep–wake disorder
- Nonverbal learning disorder

== O ==
- Occipital Neuralgia
- Occult spinal dysraphism sequence
- Ohtahara syndrome
- Olivopontocerebellar atrophy
- Opsoclonus myoclonus syndrome
- Optic neuritis
- Orthostatic hypotension
- O'Sullivan–McLeod syndrome
- Otosclerosis
- Overuse syndrome

== P ==
- Palinopsia
- PANDAS
- Pantothenate kinase-associated neurodegeneration
- Paraplegia
- Paralysis
- Paramyotonia congenita
- Paresthesia
- Paresis
- Parkinson's disease
- Paraneoplastic diseases
- Paroxysmal attacks
- Parry–Romberg syndrome
- Pelizaeus–Merzbacher disease
- Periodic paralyses
- Peripheral neuropathy
- Pervasive developmental disorders
- Phantom limb / Phantom pain
- Photic sneeze reflex
- Phytanic acid storage disease
- Pick's disease
- Pinched nerve
- Pituitary tumors
- Polyneuropathy
- PMG
- Polio
- Polymicrogyria
- Polymyositis
- Porencephaly
- Post-polio syndrome
- Postherpetic neuralgia
- Posttraumatic stress disorder
- Postural hypotension
- Postural orthostatic tachycardia syndrome
- Prader–Willi syndrome
- Primary lateral sclerosis
- Prion diseases
- Progressive hemifacial atrophy
- Progressive multifocal leukoencephalopathy
- Progressive supranuclear palsy
- Prosopagnosia
- Pseudotumor cerebri

== Q ==
- Quadrantanopia
- Quadriplegia

== R ==
- Rabies
- Radiculopathy
- Ramsay Hunt syndrome type I
- Ramsay Hunt syndrome type II
- Ramsay Hunt syndrome type III – see Ramsay–Hunt syndrome
- Rasmussen encephalitis
- Reflex neurovascular dystrophy
- Refsum disease
- REM sleep behavior disorder
- Repetitive stress injury
- Restless legs syndrome
- Retrovirus-associated myelopathy
- Rett syndrome
- Reye's syndrome
- Rhythmic movement disorder
- Romberg syndrome

== S ==
- Savant syndrome
- Saint Vitus dance
- Sandhoff disease
- Sanfilippo syndrome
- Schilder's disease (two distinct conditions)
- Schizencephaly
- Sclerosis
- Seizures
- Sensory processing disorder
- Septo-optic dysplasia
- Shaken baby syndrome
- Shingles
- Shy–Drager syndrome
- Sjögren's syndrome
- Sleep apnea
- Sleeping sickness
- Slurred speech
- Snatiation
- Sotos syndrome
- Spasticity
- Spina bifida
- Spinal and bulbar muscular atrophy
- Spinal cord injury
- Spinal cord tumors
- Spinal muscular atrophy
- Spinal muscular atrophy with respiratory distress type 1 – see Distal spinal muscular atrophy type 1
- Spinocerebellar ataxia
- Split-brain
- Steele–Richardson–Olszewski syndrome – see Progressive supranuclear palsy
- Stiff-person syndrome
- Stroke
- Sturge–Weber syndrome
- Stuttering
- Subacute sclerosing panencephalitis
- Subcortical arteriosclerotic encephalopathy
- Superficial siderosis
- Sydenham's chorea
- Syncope
- Synesthesia
- Syringomyelia
- Substance use disorder

== T ==
- Traumatic encephalopathy
- Tardive dyskinesia
- Tarlov cyst
- Tarsal tunnel syndrome
- Tay–Sachs disease
- Temporal arteritis
- Temporal lobe epilepsy
- Tetanus
- Tethered spinal cord syndrome
- Thalamocortical dysrhythmia
- Thomsen disease
- Thoracic outlet syndrome
- Tic Douloureux
- Tinnitus
- Todd's paralysis
- Tourette syndrome
- Toxic encephalopathy
- Transient ischemic attack
- Transmissible spongiform encephalopathies
- Transverse myelitis
- Traumatic brain injury
- Tremor
- Trichotillomania
- Trigeminal neuralgia
- Tropical spastic paraparesis
- Trypanosomiasis
- Tuberous sclerosis

== U ==
- Unconsciousness
- Unverricht–Lundborg disease

== V ==
- Vestibular schwannoma
- Vertigo
- Viliuisk encephalomyelitis
- Visual Snow
- Von Hippel–Lindau disease
- Vulpian-Bernhardt Syndrome

== W ==
- Wallenberg's syndrome
- Werdnig–Hoffmann disease – see Spinal muscular atrophy
- Wernicke's encephalopathy
- Wernicke Korsakoff syndrome
- West syndrome
- Whiplash
- Williams syndrome
- Wilson's disease
- Witzelsucht

== Y ==
- Y-Linked hearing impairment

== Z ==
- Zellweger syndrome

== See also ==
- List of mental disorders
