= Chronic inflammatory demyelinating polyneuropathy =

Autoimmune disease affecting the peripheral nervous system

- Other names: CIDP, chronic relapsing polyneuropathy, chronic inflammatory demyelinating polyradiculoneuropathy
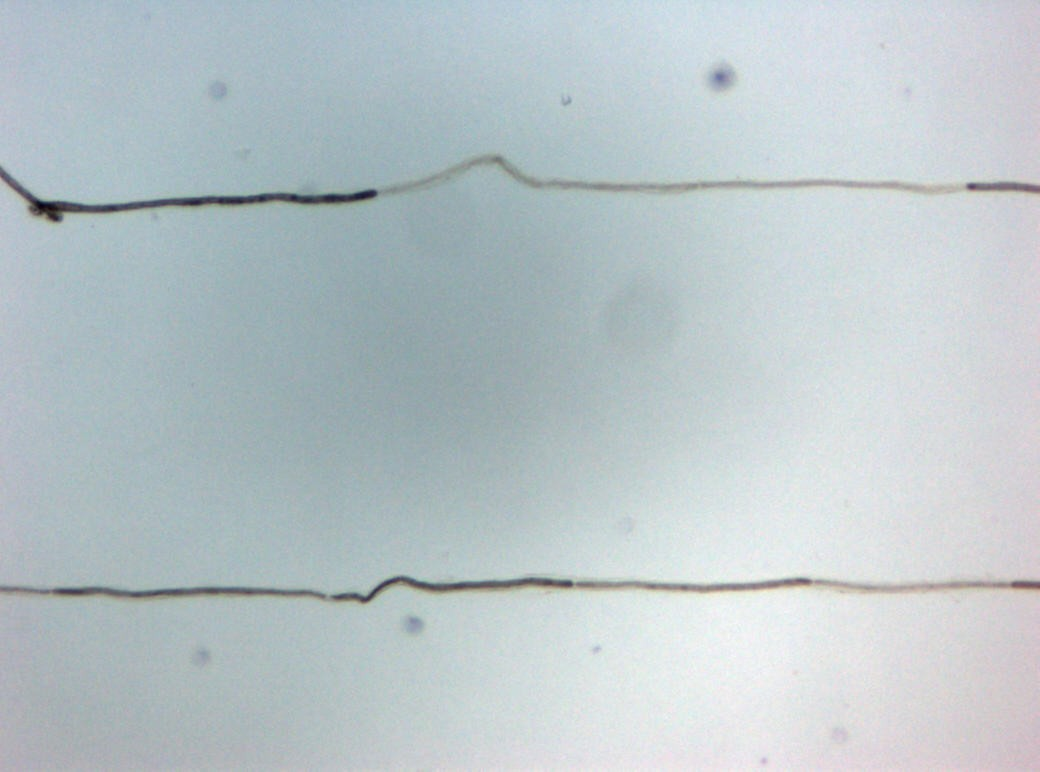
- Histopathology of Chronic inflammatory demyelinating polyneuropathy. Teased single fiber with segmental demyelination.
- Specialty: Neurology

Chronic inflammatory demyelinating polyneuropathy (CIDP) is an acquired autoimmune disease of the peripheral nervous system characterized by progressive weakness and impaired sensory function in the legs and arms.

The disorder is sometimes called chronic relapsing polyneuropathy (CRP) or chronic inflammatory demyelinating polyradiculoneuropathy (because it involves the nerve roots).

CIDP is closely related to Guillain–Barré syndrome and is considered the chronic counterpart of that acute disease. Its symptoms are also similar to progressive inflammatory neuropathy. It is one of several types of neuropathy.

== Signs and symptoms ==
In its traditional manifestation, chronic inflammatory demyelinating polyneuropathy is characterized by symmetric, progressive limb weakness and sensory loss, which typically starts in the legs. Patients report having trouble getting out of a chair, walking, climbing stairs, and falling. Problems with gripping objects, tying shoe laces, and using utensils can all be brought on by upper limb involvement. Proximal limb weakness is a fundamental clinical characteristic that sets apart chronic inflammatory demyelinating polyneuropathy from the vast majority of distal polyneuropathies, which are far more common. Proprioception impairment, distal paresthesias, loss of feeling, and poor balance are all brought on by sensory involvement. Only a small percentage of cases involve neuropathic pain.

Fatigue has been identified as common in CIDP patients, but it is unclear how much this is due to primary (due to the disease action on the body) or secondary effects (impacts on the whole person of being ill with CIDP).

Numerous reports have outlined a range of clinical patterns that are thought to be chronic inflammatory demyelinating polyneuropathy variations. Different variations include ataxic, pure motor, and pure sensory patterns; additionally, there are multifocal patterns in which the distributions of specific nerve territories experience weakness and sensory loss.

== Causes ==
Structure of a typical neuron with Schwann cells in the peripheral nervous system

Chronic inflammatory demyelinating polyneuropathy (or polyradiculoneuropathy) is considered an autoimmune disorder destroying myelin, the protective covering of the nerves. Typical early symptoms are "tingling" (sort of electrified vibration or paresthesia) or numbness in the extremities, frequent (night) leg cramps, loss of reflexes (in knees), muscle fasciculations, "vibration" feelings, loss of balance, general muscle cramping and nerve pain. CIDP is extremely rare but under-recognized and under-treated due to its heterogeneous presentation (both clinical and electrophysiological) and the limitations of clinical, serologic, and electrophysiologic diagnostic criteria. Despite these limitations, early diagnosis and treatment is favoured in preventing irreversible axonal loss and improving functional recovery.

There is a lack of awareness and treatment of CIDP. Although there are stringent research criteria for selecting patients for clinical trials, there are no generally agreed-upon clinical diagnostic criteria for CIDP due to its different presentations in symptoms and objective data. Application of the present research criteria to routine clinical practice often misses the diagnosis in a majority of patients, and patients are often left untreated despite progression of their disease.

=== Risk factors ===
HIV infection is a factor in the occurrence of CIDP. At every stage of HIV infection, distinct patterns of CIDP, whether progressive or relapsing, have been noted. Increased protein content is linked to CSF pleocytosis in the majority of HIV-CIDP cases. Pregnancy has been linked to a significantly greater risk of relapse.

=== Triggers ===
In one study, 31% (29 out of 92) CIDP patients had a history of infection or vaccination within 6 weeks of the onset of neurological symptoms, with the majority of events being non-specific infections such as upper respiratory tract, Gastroenteritis, or Cystitis according to Table 3 of the cited article. A different study showed that 30% (3 out of 10) CIDP patients had an infectious event according to Table 1 of the cited article.

=== Genetics ===
There is no known genetic predisposition to chronic inflammatory demyelinating polyneuropathy.

=== Variants with paranodal autoantibodies ===
Some variants of CIDP present autoimmunity against proteins of the node of Ranvier. These variants comprise a subgroup of inflammatory neuropathies with IgG4 autoantibodies against the paranodal proteins neurofascin-155, contactin-1 and caspr-1.

These cases are special not only because of their pathology, but also because they are non-responsive to the standard treatment. They are responsive to Rituximab instead.

Also some cases of combined central and peripheral demyelination (CCPD) could be produced by neurofascins.

=== Autoantibodies of the IgG3 Subclass in CIDP ===
Autoantibodies to components of the Ranvier nodes, specially autoantibodies the Contactin-associated protein 1 (CASPR), cause a form of CIDP with an acute "Guillain-Barre-like" phase, followed by a chronic phase with progressive symptoms. Different IgG subclasses are associated with the different phases of the disease. IgG3 Caspr autoantibodies were found during the acute GBS-like phase, while IgG4 Caspr autoantibodies were present during the chronic phase of disease.

== Mechanism ==
In the local tissue compartment of peripheral nerves, the immune system is carefully regulated by a normal, balanced collection of immunocompetent cells as well as soluble factors, maintaining the integrity of the system. Maintaining self-tolerance requires defense against immune reactions to autoantigens. Chronic inflammatory demyelinating polyneuropathy disrupts self-tolerance and activates autoreactive T and B cells, which are normally suppressed immune cells. This leads to the organ-specific damage typical of autoimmune disease. Molecular mimicry may be particularly relevant to the tolerance breakdown linked to autoimmune neuropathies. The process known as "molecular mimicry" occurs when an infectious organism that shares epitopes from its host's afflicted tissue triggers an immune response in the host. However, only a small number of convincingly identified specific targets for such a response have been found in chronic inflammatory demyelinating polyneuropathy.

Individuals with chronic inflammatory demyelinating polyneuropathy have evidence of activation of T cells in the systemic immune compartment; however, antigen specificity is still largely unknown.

It was proposed more than 20 years ago that autoantibodies play a role in the development of chronic inflammatory demyelinating polyneuropathy. This was supported by the detection of oligoclonal IgG bands in the cerebrospinal fluid and immunoglobulin as well as complement deposition on myelinated nerve fibers.

Target antigens may also include gangliosides and related glycolipids. There is serologic evidence of recent Campylobacter jejuni infection in a small number of individuals with chronic inflammatory demyelinating polyneuropathy. Because carbohydrate epitopes are expressed in both microbial lipopolysaccharides and nerve glycolipids, this discovery may, in rare cases, point to molecular mimicry as the root cause of chronic inflammatory demyelinating polyneuropathy.

Apart from myelin-directed antibodies, other serum components that can cause demyelination as well as conduction block include complement, cytokines, and other inflammatory mediators. Individuals with chronic inflammatory demyelinating polyneuropathy have a low frequency of specific antibodies, which suggests that different antibodies and different mechanisms are involved in each patient.

== Diagnosis ==
When a patient presents with a non-length-dependent demyelinating polyneuropathy which either develops chronically over several months or progresses over more than a month, CIDP may be diagnosed. There may be a secondary progressive course along with a progressive course that follows, or it may be relapsing and remitting. Pathological investigations and electrophysiological studies, if necessary, show the underlying demyelinating process.

The primary basis for diagnosing CIDP is the electrophysiological studies that depict an asymmetric demyelinating process. Comparison of the proximal and distal latencies of equivalent segments of two nerves in the same limb reveals that these patients with acquired demyelinating neuropathy frequently have a differential slowing of conduction velocity. There is always a noticeable difference in the compound muscle action potential's dispersion, and conduction block is commonly experienced.

An MRI can show proximal nerve or root enlargement and gadolinium enhancement, which indicate active inflammation as well as demyelination in the brachial plexus or cauda equina.

=== Classification ===
Clinically, CIDP is divided into "typical" and "atypical" cases. A typical case of CIDP is a symmetrical polyneuropathy that affects the proximal and distal muscles equally. Atypical cases of CIDP include multifocal acquired demyelinating sensory and motor neuropathy (MADSAM), Lewis-Sumner syndrome (LSS), and distal acquired demyelinating symmetric (DADS). DADS is a sensory or sensorimotor neuropathy that is symmetrical and length-dependent. It is frequently linked to an IgM paraprotein and noticeably longer distal motor latencies. The characteristics are typical of demyelinating neuropathy with antimyelin-associated glycoprotein (MAG) antibodies; however, anti-MAG neuropathy is not included in the CIDP criteria according to the EFNS/PNS criteria, primarily due to the presence of a particular antibody and a different response to treatment. LSS exhibits a multifocal distribution, with conduction block serving as the disease's electrophysiological hallmark. Furthermore, there have been reports of pure motor and sensory CIDP variants, with the latter occasionally limited to sensory nerve roots (chronic immune sensory polyradiculopathy). The acronym CANOMAD refers to a rare chronic ataxic neuropathy linked to disialosyl (ganglioside) antibodies, IgM paraprotein, ophthalmoplegia, and cold agglutinins.

=== Differential diagnosis ===
CIDP variants are among several types of immune-mediated neuropathies recognised. These include:

- Chronic inflammatory demyelinating polyneuropathy (CIDP) with subtypes:
  - Classical CIDP
  - CIDP with diabetes
  - CIDP/monoclonal gammopathy of undetermined significance
  - Sensory CIDP
  - Multifocal motor neuropathy
  - Multifocal acquired demyelinating sensory and motor neuropathy (Lewis-Sumner syndrome)
  - Multifocal acquired sensory and motor neuropathy
  - Distal acquired demyelinating sensory neuropathy
- Guillain–Barré syndrome with subtypes:
  - Acute inflammatory demyelinating polyradiculoneuropathy
  - Acute motor axonal neuropathy
  - Acute motor and sensory axonal neuropathy
  - Acute pandysautonomia
  - Miller Fisher syndrome
- IgM monoclonal gammopathies with subtypes:
  - Waldenström's macroglobulinemia
  - Mixed cryoglobulinemia, gait ataxia, late-onset polyneuropathy syndrome
  - Myelin-associated glycoprotein-associated gammopathy, polyneuropathy, organomegaly, endocrinopathy, M-protein and skin changes syndrome (POEMS)

Other possible diagnoses are

- Bickerstaff brainstem encephalitis
- Fisher syndrome
- Guillain–Barré syndrome

For this reason a diagnosis of chronic inflammatory demyelinating polyneuropathy needs further investigations. The diagnosis is usually provisionally made through a clinical neurological examination.

=== Tests ===
Typical diagnostic tests include:

- Electrodiagnostics – electromyography (EMG) and nerve conduction study (NCS). In usual CIDP, the nerve conduction studies show demyelination. These findings include:
  1. a reduction in nerve conduction velocities;
  2. the presence of conduction block or abnormal temporal dispersion in at least one motor nerve;
  3. prolonged distal latencies in at least two nerves;
  4. absent F waves or prolonged minimum F wave latencies in at least two motor nerves. (In some case EMG/NCV can be normal).
- Serum test to exclude other autoimmune diseases.
- Lumbar puncture and serum test for anti-ganglioside antibodies. These antibodies are present in the branch of CIDP diseases comprised by anti-GM1, anti-GD1a, and anti-GQ1b.
- Sural nerve biopsy; biopsy is considered for those patients in whom the diagnosis is not completely clear, when other causes of neuropathy (e.g., hereditary, vasculitic) cannot be excluded, or when profound axonal involvement is observed on EMG.
- Ultrasound of the peripheral nerves may show swelling of the affected nerves.
- Magnetic resonance imaging can also be used in the diagnostic workup.

In some cases electrophysiological studies fail to show any evidence of demyelination. Though conventional electrophysiological diagnostic criteria are not met, the patient may still respond to immunomodulatory treatments. In such cases, presence of clinical characteristics suggestive of CIDP are critical, justifying full investigations, including sural nerve biopsy.

== Treatment ==
First-line treatment for CIDP is currently intravenous immunoglobulin and other treatments include corticosteroids (e.g., prednisone), and plasmapheresis (plasma exchange) which may be prescribed alone or in combination with an immunosuppressant drug. Recent controlled studies show subcutaneous immunoglobulin appears to be as effective for CIDP treatment as intravenous immunoglobulin in most patients, and with fewer systemic side effects.

Intravenous immunoglobulin and plasmapheresis have proven beneficial in randomized, double-blind, placebo-controlled trials. Despite less definitive published evidence of efficacy, corticosteroids are considered standard therapies because of their long history of use and cost effectiveness. Intravenous immunoglobulin is probably the first-line CIDP treatment, but is extremely expensive. For example, in the U.S., a single 65 g dose of Gamunex brand in 2010 might be billed at the rate of $8,000 just for the immunoglobulin—not including other charges such as nurse administration.

Immunosuppressive drugs are often of the cytotoxic (chemotherapy) class, including rituximab (Rituxan) which targets B cells, and cyclophosphamide, a drug which reduces the function of the immune system. Ciclosporin has also been used in CIDP but with less frequency as it is a newer approach. Ciclosporin is thought to bind to immunocompetent lymphocytes, especially T-lymphocytes.

Non-cytotoxic immunosuppressive treatments usually include the anti-rejection transplant drugs azathioprine (Imuran/Azoran) and mycophenolate mofetil (Cellcept). In the U.S., these drugs are used "off-label", meaning that they do not have an indication for the treatment of CIDP in their package inserts. Before azathioprine is used, the patient should first have a blood test that ensures that azathioprine can safely be used.

Anti-thymocyte globulin, an immunosuppressive agent that selectively destroys T lymphocytes is being studied for use in CIDP. Anti-thymocyte globulin is the gamma globulin fraction of antiserum from animals that have been immunized against human thymocytes. It is a polyclonal antibody. Although chemotherapeutic and immunosuppressive agents have shown to be effective in treating CIDP, significant evidence is lacking, mostly due to the heterogeneous nature of the disease in the patient population in addition to the lack of controlled trials.

A review of several treatments found that azathioprine, interferon alpha and methotrexate were not effective. Cyclophosphamide and rituximab seem to have some response. Mycophenolate mofetil may be of use in milder cases. Immunoglobulin and steroids are the first line choices for treatment.

In severe cases of CIDP, when second-line immunomodulatory drugs are not efficient, autologous hematopoietic stem cell transplantation (HSCT) is sometimes performed. The treatment may induce long-term remission even in severe treatment-refractory cases of CIDP. To improve outcome, it has been suggested that it should be initiated before irreversible axonal damage has occurred. However, a precise estimation of its clinical efficacy for CIDP is not available, as randomized controlled trials (RCT) have not been performed. (In MS, the ASTIMS RCT provides evidence for superior effect of HSCT to the then-best practice for treatment of aggressive MS. The more recent MIST RCT confirmed its superiority in MS.)

Physical therapy and occupational therapy may improve muscle strength, activities of daily living, mobility, and minimize the shrinkage of muscles and tendons and distortions of the joints.

Ongoing specialist community support, information, advice, and guidance is available from a range of Charities, Non-Government Organisations (NGOs), and Patient Advisory Groups around the world. In the United Kingdom this is provided by Inflammatory Neuropathies UK, in the USA it is provided by GBS/CIDP Foundation International, and in The European Union by a range of organisations under the umbrella of EPODIN (European Patient Organization for Dysimmune & Inflammatory Neuropathies)

== Prognosis ==
As in multiple sclerosis, another demyelinating condition, it is not possible to predict with certainty how CIDP will affect patients over time. The pattern of relapses and remissions varies greatly with each patient. A period of relapse can be very disturbing, but many patients make significant recoveries.

If diagnosed early, initiation of early treatment to prevent loss of nerve axons is recommended. However, many individuals are left with residual numbness, weakness, tremors, fatigue and other symptoms which can lead to long-term morbidity and diminished quality of life.

It is important to build a good relationship with doctors, both primary care and specialist. Because of the rarity of the illness, many doctors will not have encountered it before. Each case of CIDP is different, and relapses, if they occur, may bring new symptoms and problems. Because of the variability in severity and progression of the disease, doctors will not be able to give a definite prognosis. A period of experimentation with different treatment regimens is likely to be necessary in order to discover the most appropriate treatment regimen for a given patient.

== Epidemiology ==
In 1982 Lewis et al. reported a group of patients with a chronic asymmetrical sensorimotor neuropathy mostly affecting the arms with multifocal involvement of peripheral nerves. Also in 1982, Dyck et al reported a response to prednisolone to a condition they referred to as chronic inflammatory demyelinating polyradiculoneuropathy. Parry and Clarke in 1988 described a neuropathy which was later found to be associated with IgM autoantibodies directed against GM1 gangliosides. This latter condition was later termed multifocal motor neuropathy This distinction is important because multifocal motor neuropathy responds to intravenous immunoglobulin alone, while chronic inflammatory demyelinating polyneuropathy responds to intravenous immunoglobulin, steroids and plasma exchange. It has been suggested that multifocal motor neuropathy is distinct from chronic inflammatory demyelinating polyneuropathy and that Lewis-Sumner syndrome is a distinct variant type of chronic inflammatory demyelinating polyneuropathy.

The Lewis-Sumner form of this condition is considered a rare disease with only 50 cases reported up to 2004. A total of 90 cases had been reported by 2009.

== Vaccine injury compensation for CIDP ==
The National Vaccine Injury Compensation Program has awarded money damages to patients who came down with CIDP after receiving one of the childhood vaccines listed on the Federal Government's vaccine injury table. These Vaccine Court awards often come with language stating that the Court denies that the specific vaccine "caused petitioner to suffer CIDP or any other injury. Nevertheless, the parties agree to the joint stipulation, attached hereto as Appendix A. The undersigned finds said stipulation reasonable and adopts it as the decision of the Court in awarding damages, on the terms set forth therein." A keyword search on the Court of Federal Claims "Opinions/Orders" database for the term "CIDP" returns 202 opinions related to CIDP and vaccine injury compensation.

== See also ==
- List of neurological conditions and disorders
- Neurological disorder
