= CEP126 =

Protein-coding gene in the species Homo sapiens

Identifiers
- Aliases: CEP126, KIAA1377, centrosomal protein 126
- External IDs: OMIM: 614634; MGI: 2680221; GeneCards: CEP126

Gene location (Human)
Chr.	Chromosome 11 (human)
Band	11q22.1	Start	101,915,010 bp
Band	11q22.1	End	102,001,062 bp

Gene location (Mouse)
Chr.	Chromosome 9 (mouse)
Band	9|9 A1	Start	8,076,461 bp
Band	9|9 A1	End	8,134,294 bp
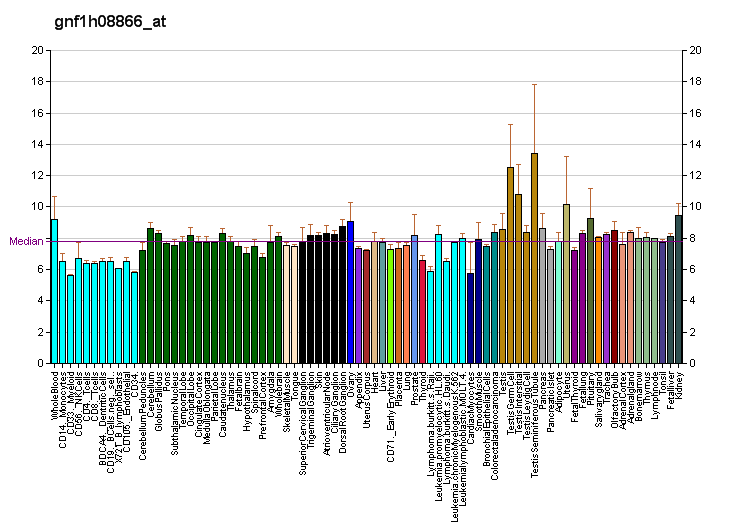
RNA expression pattern
Bgee	Human / Mouse (ortholog); Top expressed in: bronchial epithelial cell; Brodmann area 23; mucosa of paranasal sinus; middle temporal gyrus; buccal mucosa cell; right uterine tube; endothelial cell; entorhinal cortex; tibia; postcentral gyrus / Top expressed in: spermatid; spermatocyte; seminiferous tubule; choroidal fissure; tail of embryo; respiratory epithelium; olfactory epithelium; genital tubercle; neural layer of retina; cerebellar cortex; More reference expression data
BioGPS	More reference expression data
Gene ontology
Molecular function	protein binding
Cellular component	cytoplasm; microtubule organizing center; centrosome; cell projection; cytoskeleton; ciliary base; midbody
Biological process	mitotic spindle organization; cell projection organization; cytoplasmic microtubule organization; cilium assembly; non-motile cilium assembly
Sources:Amigo / QuickGO
Orthologs
Databases	NCBI: entry; OMA: entry
Species	Human	Mouse
Entrez	57562	234915
Ensembl	ENSG00000110318	ENSMUSG00000040729
UniProt	Q9P2H0	Q0VBV7
RefSeq (mRNA)	NM_020802; NM_001363543	NM_001045524; NM_001368148
RefSeq (protein)	NP_065853; NP_001350472	NP_001038989; NP_001355077
Location (UCSC)	Chr 11: 101.92 – 102 Mb	Chr 9: 8.08 – 8.13 Mb
PubMed search
- Wikidata
View/Edit Human	View/Edit Mouse

Centrosomal protein of 126 kDa (or Cep126) is a protein that in humans is encoded by the CEP126 gene (previously KIAA1377). The Cep126 protein has been shown to localize to the centrosome. Furthermore, it is found at pericentriolar satellites and the base of the primary cilium. Depleting Cep126 leads to dispersion of pericentriolar satellites, in turn disrupting microtubule organization at the mitotic spindle.

== Clinical relevance ==
Mutations in this gene have been found to cause monomelic amyotrophy.
