= Mingazzini =

Mingazzini is an Italian surname. Notable people with the surname include:

- Giovanni Mingazzini (1859–1929), Italian neurologist
- Nicola Mingazzini (born 1980), Italian footballer
