= Strohl =

Strohl is a South German surname that means "slight or skinny person" or "fair-haired one". Variants include Ströhl and Stroehl.

Notable people with this surname include:

- Hugo Gerard Ströhl (1851–1919), Austrian heraldist
- André Strohl (1887–1977), physiologist, one of the discoverers of Guillain–Barré syndrome
- Joseph A. Strohl (1946– ), a Wisconsin, USA politician
- Rita Strohl (1865–1941), French composer and pianist
- Thomas Ströhl (1988– ), German footballer
