= Ramsay Hunt syndrome type 3 =

Medical condition

Ramsay Hunt syndrome type 3 is a less commonly referenced condition, an occupationally induced neuropathy of the deep palmar branch of the ulnar nerve. It is also called Hunt's disease or artisan's palsy.

It is different from Ramsay Hunt syndrome type 1 and Ramsay Hunt syndrome type 2, which are completely unrelated other than having been described by the same researcher, James Ramsay Hunt.
