= Mitumomab =

Monoclonal antibody

Monoclonal antibody
- Type: Whole antibody
- Source: Mouse
- Target: GD3 ganglioside

Clinical data
- ATC code: none

Identifiers
- CAS Number: 216503-58-1
- IUPHAR/BPS: 7981
- ChemSpider: none
- UNII: KZ9WFQ2NXF
- KEGG: D05061

Mitumomab (BEC-2) is a mouse anti-BEC-2 monoclonal antibody investigated for the treatment of small cell lung carcinoma in combination with BCG vaccination. Mitumomab attacks tumour cells, while the vaccine is thought to activate the immune system. It was developed by ImClone and Merck.

The first phase III clinical trial began in 1998. In 2005 and again in 2008, results were published showing no benefit to patients receiving mitumomab and BCG.

== See also ==
- Anti-ganglioside antibodies
