= Progressive inflammatory neuropathy =

- Specialty: Neurology, immunology

Progressive inflammatory neuropathy is an autoimmune disease that was identified in a report, released on January 31, 2008, by the Centers for Disease Control and Prevention. The first known outbreak of this neuropathy occurred in southeastern Minnesota in the United States. The disease was reported among slaughterhouse workers who appeared at various care facilities in the area reporting similar neurological symptoms. The disease was later identified at slaughterhouses in Indiana and Nebraska as well. The condition is characterized by acute paralysis, pain, fatigue, numbness, and weakness, especially in extremities. It was initially believed that workers might have contracted the disease through inhaling aerosols from pig brains that were created by a machine at the slaughterhouse and that an autoimmune response to the particles might have produced their mysterious peripheral neuropathy. These suspicions were confirmed in reports and investigations conducted at the Mayo Clinic in Rochester, Minnesota.

== Cause ==
An initial comprehensive study of 24 known cases was conducted by multiple doctors from various disciplines at the Mayo Clinic. They identified the cause of this neurological disease to be long-term occupational exposure to aerosolized porcine brain and spinal tissue. Investigators from the Minnesota Department of Health simultaneously determined that the air pressure jet system used to extract the brain from pig carcasses was unsafe, as it would create an airborne mist of pig organs. The workers closest in proximity to the "head table", an area in the factory where the air system was used, were the most likely to be affected. The aerosolized mist was readily absorbed into the workers' nasal mucosa. The pig proteins were then recognized by their bodies as foreign and an autoimmune response was initiated. Researchers determined that the disease was due to the voltage-gated potassium channels being blocked by autoantibodies that are induced by pig brain antigen exposure, causing an intracellular build-up of potassium ions which causes inflammation and irritation, and consequently, hyper-excitability in the peripheral nervous system. It is this hyper-excitability that leads to the tingling, numbness, pain, and weakness.

Researchers from the Mayo Clinic developed an animal model that involved mice receiving twice daily doses of minced pig brain tissue in saline intranasally. Biochemical testing indicated the signature autoantibodies (potassium channel antibodies, myelin basic protein antibodies and calcium channel antibodies) were present in experimental mice. This animal model confirmed the hypothesized mechanism of progressive inflammatory neuropathy.

== Diagnosis ==
Over 40 laboratory tests were initially conducted to rule out various pathogens and environmental toxins. These tests were used to try to identify potential viruses carried by humans, pigs, or both, including rotaviruses, adenoviruses, hepatitis A, and hepatitis E. Investigators also tried to identify bacteria such as Salmonella and Escherichia coli, and parasites such as Giardia and Cryptosporidium that could be causing the symptoms. All of these infectious causes were ruled out.

Prion diseases such as bovine spongiform encephalopathy (BSE), chronic wasting disease (CWD), and variant Creutzfeldt–Jakob disease were also quickly ruled out as being the cause of this neuropathy.

Next two very similar autoimmune neuropathies were ruled out: Guillain–Barré syndrome is an acute autoimmune response which affects the Schwann cells in the peripheral nervous system. Guillain–Barré syndrome is usually triggered by a recent infection (or more rarely a recent vaccination) and causes weakness and tingling in the arms and legs. Researchers also looked at chronic inflammatory demyelinating polyneuropathy which is characterized by progressive weakness and sensory impairment in the arms and legs. Damage occurs to the myelin sheathing in the peripheral nervous system. However, as doctors at the Mayo Clinic were beginning to note, the problem they were seeing in progressive inflammatory neuropathy was occurring in the spinal nerve roots.

== Treatment and history ==
In October 2007 an astute medical interpreter noticed similar neurological symptoms being reported by Spanish-speaking patients seeking treatment from different physicians at the Austin Medical Center, in Austin, Minnesota. Not only did these patients share similar neurological symptoms, they also worked at the same slaughterhouse. Dr. Daniel LaChance, a physician at both the Austin Medical Center and the Mayo Clinic in nearby Rochester, Minnesota, was notified. He launched a request to area physicians to refer other patients with similar symptoms to him. The Minnesota Department of Health was notified and began an investigation into the "outbreak." They identified workers from two other pork facilities in Indiana and Nebraska who also had parallel neurological complaints. Several agencies including the Occupational Safety and Health Administration and the Centers for Disease Control and Prevention were brought in to assist. Simultaneously investigations were conducted to rule out contagious disease, to locate the source or carrier, and to identify what exactly was causing these workers to develop these symptoms.

Removal from exposure was the first line of treatment. Due to the progressive sensory loss and weakness, various medications were often required. These included intravenous methylprednisolone, oral prednisone, azathioprine, and/or IVIG. All 24 patients improved, including 7 who received no treatment and 17 who required immunosuppressive drugs.

It is expected that there will be no new cases of progressive inflammatory neuropathy since this particular carcass processing method has been discontinued.

== See also ==
- Autoimmune disease
- Neuropathy
- Peripheral neuropathy
- Polyneuropathy
