= Guillain–Barré syndrome =

Autoimmune disease

- Other names: Guillain–Barré–Strohl syndrome, Landry's paralysis, postinfectious polyneuritis, Acute Inflammatory Demyelinating Polyneuropathy
- Pronunciation: UK: /ˌɡiː(j)æn ˈbæreɪ, ˌɡiːlæn -/ GHEE-(y)an BARR-ay, GHEE-lan - US: /ɡiːˌjæn bəˈreɪ, ɡiːˌ(j)æn -/ ghee-LAN bə-RAY, ghee-(y)AN - French: [ɡilɛ̃ baʁe]
- Specialty: Neurology, critical care medicine, immunology
- Symptoms: Muscle weakness beginning in the feet and hands, usually ascending
- Complications: Breathing difficulties, heart and blood pressure problems
- Usual onset: Rapid (hours to weeks)
- Causes: Typically triggered by an infection; occasionally by surgery
- Diagnostic method: Based on symptoms, nerve conduction studies, lumbar puncture
- Treatment: Supportive care, intravenous immunoglobulin, plasmapheresis
- Prognosis: Weeks to years for recovery
- Frequency: 2 per 100,000 people per year
- Deaths: 7.5% of those affected
- Named after: Georges Guillain; Jean Alexandre Barré

Guillain–Barré syndrome (GBS) is a rapid-onset muscle weakness caused by the immune system damaging the peripheral nervous system. Typically, both sides of the body are involved, and the initial symptoms are changes in sensation or pain often in the back along with muscle weakness, beginning in the feet and hands, often spreading to the arms and upper body. The symptoms may develop over hours to a few weeks. During the acute phase, the disorder can be life-threatening, with about 15% of people developing respiratory muscle weakness requiring mechanical ventilation. Some are affected by changes in the function of the autonomic nervous system, which can lead to dangerous abnormalities in heart rate and blood pressure.

Although the cause is unknown, the underlying mechanism involves an autoimmune disorder in which the body's immune system mistakenly attacks the peripheral nerves and damages their myelin insulation. Sometimes this immune dysfunction is triggered by a viral infection or, less commonly, by surgery. It is questionable whether it may very rarely be triggered by vaccination, with evidence existing for a causal relationship only to the 1976 swine flu vaccine and older rabies vaccines created with animal brain tissue. The diagnosis is usually based on the signs and symptoms through the exclusion of alternative causes and supported by tests such as nerve conduction studies and examination of the cerebrospinal fluid. There are several subtypes based on the areas of weakness, results of nerve conduction studies, and the presence of certain antibodies. It is classified as an acute polyneuropathy.

In those with severe weakness, prompt treatment with intravenous immunoglobulins or plasmapheresis, together with supportive care, leads to good recovery in the majority of cases. Recovery may take weeks to years, with about a third having some permanent weakness. Globally, death occurs in approximately 7.5% of patients. Guillain–Barré syndrome is rare, at 1 or 2 cases per 100,000 people every year.

The syndrome is named after the French neurologists Georges Guillain and Jean Alexandre Barré, who, together with French physician André Strohl, described the condition in 1916.

== Signs and symptoms ==
The first symptoms of Guillain–Barré syndrome are numbness, tingling, and pain, alone or in combination. This is followed by weakness of the legs and arms that affects both sides equally and worsens over time. The weakness can take half a day to over two weeks to reach maximum severity, and then becomes steady. In one in five people, the weakness continues to progress for as long as four weeks. The muscles of the neck may also be affected, and about half experience involvement of the cranial nerves that supply the head and face; this may lead to weakness of the muscles of the face, swallowing difficulties and sometimes weakness of the eye muscles. In 8%, the weakness affects only the legs (paraplegia or paraparesis). Involvement of the muscles that control the bladder and anus is unusual. In total, about a third of people with Guillain–Barré syndrome continue to be able to walk. Once the weakness has stopped progressing, it persists at a stable level ("plateau phase") before improvement occurs. The plateau phase can take between two days and six months, but the most common duration is a week. Pain-related symptoms affect more than half, and include back pain, paraesthesia, muscle pain, and pain in the head and neck relating to irritation of the lining of the brain.

Many people with Guillain–Barré syndrome have experienced the signs and symptoms of an infection in the 3–6 weeks before the onset of the neurological symptoms. The infection typically affects the upper respiratory tract (rhinitis, sore throat, cough) or gastrointestinal tract (diarrhea, abdominal pain, bloating).

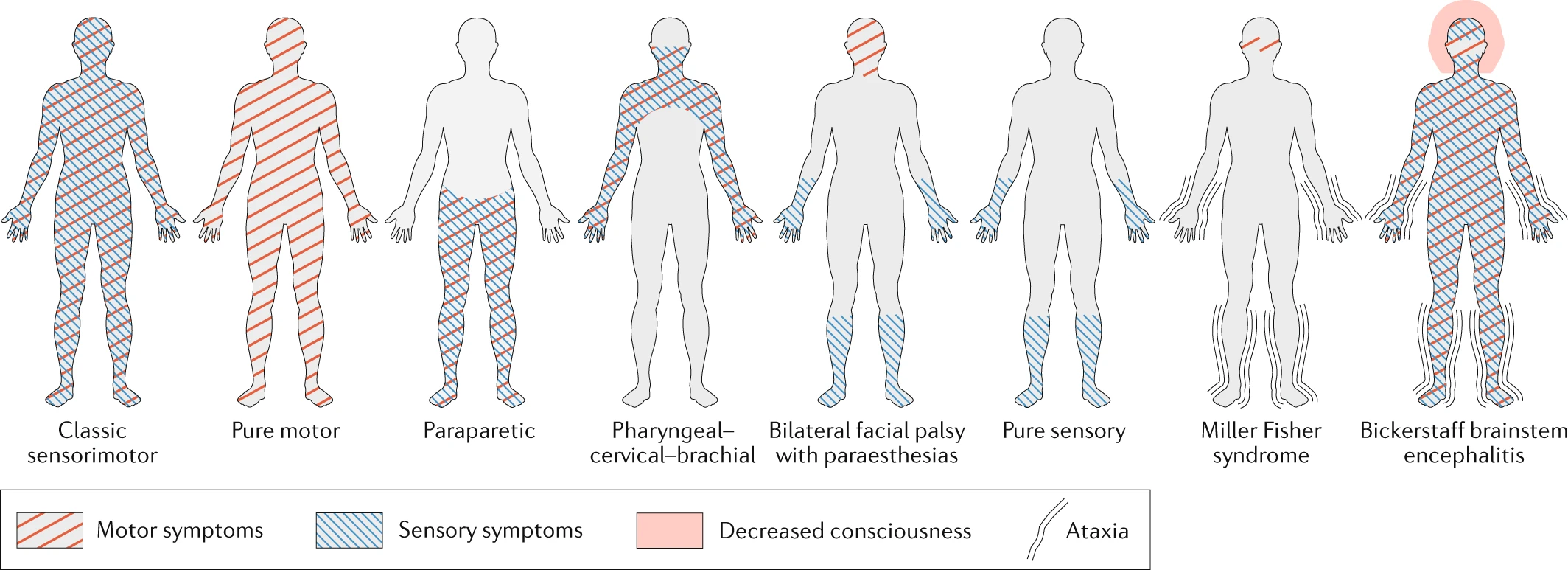
Various patterns of manifestation of Guillain–Barré syndrome

In children, particularly those younger than six years old, the diagnosis can be difficult, and the condition is often initially mistaken (sometimes for up to two weeks) for other causes of pain and difficulty walking, such as viral infections, or bone and joint problems.

On neurological examination, characteristic features are the reduced strength of muscles and reduced or absent tendon reflexes (hypo- or areflexia, respectively). However, a small proportion have normal reflexes in affected limbs before developing areflexia, and some may have exaggerated reflexes. In the Miller Fisher variant of Guillain–Barré syndrome, a triad of weakness of the eye muscles, abnormalities in coordination, as well as absent reflexes can be found. The level of consciousness is normally unaffected in Guillain–Barré syndrome, but the Bickerstaff brainstem encephalitis subtype may feature drowsiness, sleepiness, or coma.

=== Respiratory failure ===
A quarter of all people with Guillain–Barré syndrome develop weakness of the breathing muscles leading to respiratory failure, the inability to breathe adequately to maintain healthy levels of oxygen, and/or carbon dioxide in the blood. This life-threatening scenario is complicated by other medical problems such as pneumonia, severe infections, blood clots in the lungs, and bleeding in the digestive tract in 60% of those who require artificial ventilation.

=== Autonomic dysfunction ===
The autonomic or involuntary nervous system, which is involved in the control of body functions such as heart rate and blood pressure, is affected in two-thirds of people with Guillain–Barré syndrome, but the impact is variable. Twenty percent may experience severe blood-pressure fluctuations and irregularities in the heart beat, sometimes to the point that the heart beat stops and requires pacemaker-based treatment. Other associated problems are abnormalities in perspiration and changes in the reactivity of the pupils. Autonomic nervous system involvement can affect even those who do not have severe muscle weakness.

== Causes ==
=== Infection onset ===
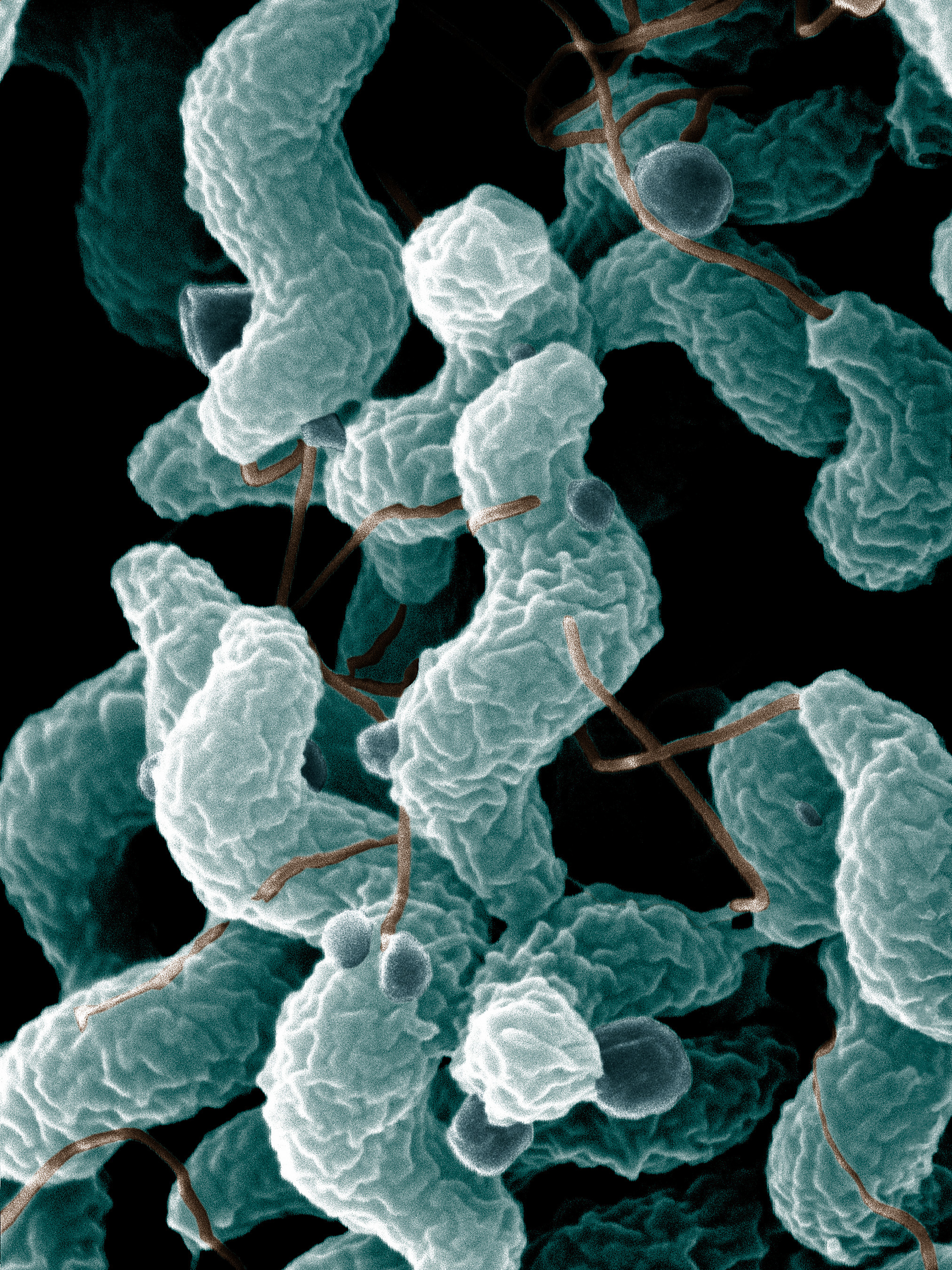
A scanning electron microscope-derived image of Campylobacter jejuni, which triggers about 30% of cases of Guillain–Barré syndrome

Two-thirds of people with Guillain–Barré syndrome have experienced an infection before the onset of the condition. Most commonly, these are episodes of gastroenteritis or a respiratory tract infection. In many cases, the exact nature of the infection can be confirmed. Approximately 30% of cases are provoked by Campylobacter jejuni bacteria, which cause diarrhea. A further 10% are attributable to cytomegalovirus (CMV, HHV-5). Despite this, only very few people with Campylobacter or CMV infections develop Guillain–Barré syndrome (0.25–0.65 per 1000 and 0.6–2.2 per 1000 episodes, respectively). The strain of Campylobacter involved may determine the risk of GBS; different forms of the bacteria have different lipopolysaccharides on their surface, and some may induce illness (see below) while others will not.

Links between other infections and GBS are less certain. Two other herpes viruses (Epstein–Barr virus/HHV-4 and varicella zoster virus/HHV-3) and the bacterium Mycoplasma pneumoniae have been associated with GBS. GBS is known to occur after influenza, and influenza vaccination has been demonstrated to be associated with a reduced risk. The tropical flaviviral infections dengue fever and Zika virus have also been associated with episodes of GBS. Previous hepatitis E virus infection is more common in people with GBS.

=== Vaccine onset ===
An increased incidence of Guillain–Barré syndrome followed influenza immunization that followed the 1976 swine flu outbreak (H1N1 A/NJ/76); 8.8 cases per million (0.0088 per 1000) recipients developed it as a complication. GBS cases occurred in 362 patients during the 6 weeks after influenza vaccination of 45 million persons, an 8.8-fold increase over normal rates. The 1976 swine flu vaccination-induced GBS was an outlier; small increases in incidence have been observed in subsequent vaccination campaigns, but not to the same extent. The 2009 flu pandemic vaccine against pandemic swine flu virus H1N1/PDM09 did not cause a significant increase in cases. In fact, "studies found a small increase of approximately 1 case per million vaccines above the baseline rate, which is similar to that observed after administration of seasonal influenza vaccines over the past several years." Natural influenza infection is a stronger risk factor for the development of GBS than is influenza vaccination and the vaccination reduced the risk of GBS overall by lowering the risk of catching influenza.

In the United States, GBS after seasonal influenza vaccination is listed on the federal government's vaccine injury table. On March 24, 2021, after reviewing several post-marketing observational studies, where an increased risk of Guillain–Barré syndrome was observed after 42 days following vaccination with the Zoster vaccine Shingrix, the FDA required safety label changes from the manufacturer GlaxoSmithKline to include warnings for risk of Guillain–Barré syndrome.

=== COVID-19 infection or vaccine related ===
GBS has been reported in association with COVID-19, and may be a potential neurological complication of the disease. GBS has been reported as a very rare side effect of the Janssen and Oxford–AstraZeneca COVID-19 vaccines and the European Medicines Agency issued a warning to patients and healthcare providers. The incidence of GBS following vaccination with the Oxford–AstraZeneca vaccine was originally reported as being lower than the incidence of GBS following a COVID-19 infection. More recent studies, however, found no measurable link between COVID-19 infection and GBS, while correlations with a first dose of AstraZeneca or Janssen vaccines were still positive.

COVID-19 has been reported as causing peripheral neuropathy and more recently some evidence of aggravation of autoimmune disorders including GBS.

=== Drug induced ===
Zimelidine, an antidepressant, had a very favorable safety profile, but as a result of rare case reports of Guillain–Barré syndrome was withdrawn from the market.

== Pathophysiology ==
Structure of a typical neuron

Guillain–Barré syndrome – nerve damage

The nerve dysfunction in Guillain–Barré syndrome is caused by an immune attack on the nerve cells of the peripheral nervous system and their support structures. The nerve cells have their body (the soma) in the spinal cord and a long projection (the axon) that carries electrical nerve impulses to the neuromuscular junction, where the impulse is transferred to the muscle. Axons are wrapped in a sheath of Schwann cells that contain myelin. Between Schwann cells are gaps (nodes of Ranvier) where the axon is exposed. Different types of Guillain–Barré syndrome feature different types of immune attacks. The demyelinating variant (AIDP, see below) features damage to the myelin sheath by white blood cells (T lymphocytes and macrophages); this process is preceded by activation of a group of blood proteins known as complement. In contrast, the axonal variant is mediated by IgG antibodies and complement against the cell membrane covering the axon without direct lymphocyte involvement.

Various antibodies directed at nerve cells have been reported in Guillain–Barré syndrome. In the axonal subtype, these antibodies have been shown to bind to gangliosides, a group of substances found in peripheral nerves. A ganglioside is a molecule consisting of ceramide bound to a small group of hexose-type sugars and containing various numbers of N-acetylneuraminic acid groups. The key four gangliosides against which antibodies have been described are GM1, GD1a, GT1a, and GQ1b, with different antiganglioside antibodies being associated with particular features; for instance, GQ1b antibodies have been linked with Miller Fisher variant GBS and related forms including Bickerstaff encephalitis. The production of these antibodies after an infection probably is the result of molecular mimicry, where the immune system is reacting to microbial substances, but the resultant antibodies also react with substances occurring naturally in the body. After a Campylobacter infection, the body produces antibodies of the IgA class; only a small proportion of people also produce IgG antibodies against bacterial substance cell wall substances (e.g. lipooligosaccharides) that cross-react with human nerve cell gangliosides. It is not currently known how this process escapes central tolerance to gangliosides, which is meant to suppress the production of antibodies against the body's own substances. Not all antiganglioside antibodies cause disease, and it has recently been suggested that some antibodies bind to more than one type of epitope simultaneously (heterodimeric binding) and that this determines the response. Furthermore, the development of pathogenic antibodies may depend on the presence of other strains of bacteria in the bowel.

It has been suggested that a poor injection technique may also cause a direct injury to the axillary nerves adjacent to the injection site in the deltoid muscle, which may lead to peripheral neuropathy. The consequent vaccine transfection and translation in the nerves may spur an immune response against nerve cells, potentially causing an autoimmune nerve damage, leading to conditions like Guillain–Barré syndrome.

== Diagnosis ==
The diagnosis of Guillain–Barré syndrome depends on findings such as rapid development of muscle paralysis, absent reflexes, absence of fever, and absence of a likely cause. Cerebrospinal fluid analysis (through a lumbar spinal puncture) and nerve conduction studies are supportive investigations commonly performed in the diagnosis of GBS. Testing for antiganglioside antibodies is often performed, but their contribution to diagnosis is usually limited. Blood tests are generally performed to exclude the possibility of another cause for weakness, such as a low level of potassium in the blood. An abnormally low level of sodium in the blood is often encountered in Guillain–Barré syndrome. This has been attributed to the inappropriate secretion of antidiuretic hormone, leading to relative retention of water.

In many cases, magnetic resonance imaging of the spinal cord is performed to distinguish between Guillain–Barré syndrome and other conditions causing limb weakness, such as spinal cord compression. If an MRI scan shows enhancement of the nerve roots, this may be indicative of GBS. In children, this feature is present in 95% of scans, but it is not specific to Guillain–Barré syndrome, so other confirmation is also needed.

=== Spinal fluid ===
Cerebrospinal fluid envelops the brain and the spine, and a lumbar puncture or spinal tap is the removal of a small amount of fluid using a needle inserted between the lumbar vertebrae. Characteristic findings in Guillain–Barré syndrome are an elevated protein level, usually greater than 0.55 g/L, and fewer than 10 white blood cells per cubic millimeter of fluid ("albuminocytological dissociation"). This pattern distinguishes Guillain–Barré syndrome from other conditions (such as lymphoma and poliomyelitis) in which both the protein and the cell count are elevated. Elevated CSF protein levels are found in approximately 50% of patients in the first 3 days after onset of weakness, which increases to 80% after the first week.

Repeating the lumbar puncture during the disease course is not recommended. The protein levels may rise after treatment has been administered.

=== Neurophysiology ===
Directly assessing nerve conduction of electrical impulses can exclude other causes of acute muscle weakness, as well as distinguish the different types of Guillain–Barré syndrome. Needle electromyography (EMG) and nerve conduction studies may be performed. In the first two weeks, these investigations may not show any abnormality. Neurophysiology studies are not required for the diagnosis.

Formal criteria exist for each of the main subtypes of Guillain–Barré syndrome (AIDP and AMAN/AMSAN, see below), but these may misclassify some cases (particularly where there is reversible conduction failure), and therefore changes to these criteria have been proposed. Sometimes, repeated testing may be helpful.

=== Clinical subtypes ===
Several subtypes of Guillain–Barré syndrome are recognized. Despite this, many people have overlapping symptoms that can make the classification difficult in individual cases. All types have partial forms. For instance, some people experience only isolated eye movement or coordination problems; these are thought to be a subtype of Miller Fisher syndrome and have similar antiganglioside antibody patterns.

Type	Symptoms	Population affected	Nerve conduction studies	Antiganglioside antibodies
Acute Inflammatory Demyelinating Polyradiculoneuropathy (AIDP)	Sensory symptoms and muscle weakness, often with cranial nerve weakness and autonomic involvement	Most common in Europe and North America	Demyelinating polyneuropathy	No clear association
Acute motor axonal neuropathy (AMAN)	Isolated muscle weakness without sensory symptoms occurs in less than 10%; cranial nerve involvement is uncommon	Rare in Europe and North America, a substantial proportion (30–65%) in Asia and Central and South America; sometimes called "Chinese paralytic syndrome."	Axonal polyneuropathy, normal sensory action potential	GM1a/b, GD1a & GalNac-GD1a
Acute motor and sensory axonal neuropathy (AMSAN)	Severe muscle weakness similar to AMAN but with sensory loss	—N/a	Axonal polyneuropathy, reduced or absent sensory action potential	GM1, GD1a
Pharyngeal-cervical-brachial variant	Weakness, particularly of the throat muscles, face, neck, and shoulder muscles	—N/a	Generally normal, sometimes axonal neuropathy in arms	Mostly GT1a, occasionally GQ1b, rarely GD1a
Miller Fisher syndrome	Ataxia, eye muscle weakness, areflexia, but usually no limb weakness	This variant occurs more commonly in men than in women (2:1 ratio). Cases typically occur in the spring, and the average age of occurrence is 43 years old.	Generally normal, sometimes discrete changes in sensory conduction or H-reflex are detected	GQ1b, GT1a

Other diagnostic entities are often included in the spectrum of Guillain–Barré syndrome. Bickerstaff's brainstem encephalitis (BBE), for instance, is part of the group of conditions now regarded as forms of Miller Fisher syndrome (anti-GQ1b antibody syndrome), as well as a related condition labelled "acute ataxic hypersomnolence" where coordination problems and drowsiness are present but no muscle weakness can be detected. BBE is characterized by the rapid onset of ophthalmoplegia, ataxia, and disturbance of consciousness, and may be associated with absent or decreased tendon reflexes, as well as Babinski's sign. The course of the disease is usually monophasic, but recurrent episodes have been reported. MRI abnormalities in the brainstem have been reported in 11%.

Whether isolated acute sensory loss can be regarded as a form of Guillain–Barré syndrome is a matter of dispute; this is a rare occurrence compared to GBS with muscle weakness but no sensory symptoms.

== Treatment ==
=== Immunotherapy ===
Plasmapheresis and intravenous immunoglobulins (IVIG) are the two main immunotherapy treatments for GBS. Plasmapheresis attempts to reduce the body's attack on the nervous system by filtering antibodies out of the bloodstream. Similarly, administration of IVIG neutralizes harmful antibodies and inflammation. These two treatments are equally effective, but a combination of the two is not significantly better than either alone. Plasmapheresis speeds recovery when used within four weeks of the onset of symptoms. IVIG works as well as plasmapheresis when started within two weeks of the onset of symptoms, and has fewer complications. IVIG is usually used first because of its ease of administration and safety; the risks include occasionally causing liver inflammation, or in rare cases, kidney failure. Glucocorticoids alone are not effective in speeding recovery and could potentially delay recovery.

=== Respiratory failure ===
Respiratory failure may require intubation of the trachea and breathing support through mechanical ventilation, generally on an intensive care unit. The need for ventilatory support can be anticipated by measurement of two spirometry-based breathing tests: the forced vital capacity (FVC) and the negative inspiratory force (NIF). An FVC of less than 15 mL per kilogram body weight or an NIF of less than 60 cmH_{2}O are considered markers of severe respiratory failure.

=== Pain ===
While pain is common in people with Guillain–Barré syndrome, studies comparing different types of pain medication are insufficient to make a recommendation as to which should be used.

=== Rehabilitation ===
Following the acute phase, around 40% of people require intensive rehabilitation with the help of a multidisciplinary team to focus on improving activities of daily living (ADLs). Studies of the subject have been limited, but it is likely that intensive rehabilitation improves long-term symptoms. Teams may include physical therapists, occupational therapists, speech language pathologists, social workers, psychologists, other allied health professionals and nurses. The team usually works under the supervision of a neurologist or rehabilitation physician directing treatment goals.

Physiotherapy interventions include strength, endurance, and gait training with graduated increases in mobility, maintenance of posture and alignment, as well as joint function. Occupational therapy aims to improve everyday function with domestic and community tasks, as well as driving and work. Home modifications, gait aids, orthotics, and splints may be provided. Speech-language pathology input may be required in those with speech and swallowing problems, as well as to support communication in those who require ongoing breathing support (often through a tracheostomy). Nutritional support may be provided by the team and by dietitians. Psychologists may provide counselling and support. Psychological interventions may also be required for anxiety, fear, and depression.

Ongoing specialist community support, information, advice, and guidance are available from a range of charities, NGOs, and patient advisory groups around the world. In the United Kingdom this is provided by Inflammatory Neuropathies UK, in the United States by GBS/CIDP Foundation International, and in the European Union by a range of organisations under the umbrella of EPODIN (European Patient Organization for Dysimmune & Inflammatory Neuropathies).

== Prognosis ==
Guillain–Barré syndrome can lead to death as a result of many complications: severe infections, blood clots, and cardiac arrest, likely due to autonomic neuropathy. Despite optimal care, this occurs in about 5% of cases.

There is a variation in the rate and extent of recovery. The prognosis of Guillain–Barré syndrome is determined mainly by age (those over 40 may have a poorer outcome), and by the severity of symptoms after two weeks. Furthermore, those who experienced diarrhea before the onset of the disease have a worse prognosis. In the nerve conduction study, the presence of conduction block predicts poorer outcomes at six months. In those who have received intravenous immunoglobulins, a smaller increase in IgG in the blood two weeks after administration is associated with poorer mobility outcomes at six months than those whose IgG level increased substantially. If the disease continues to progress beyond four weeks, or there are multiple fluctuations in the severity (more than two in eight weeks), the diagnosis may be chronic inflammatory demyelinating polyneuropathy, which is treated differently.

In research studies, the outcome from an episode of Guillain–Barré syndrome is recorded on a scale from 0 to 6, where 0 denotes completely healthy:

1. very minor symptoms, but able to run;
2. able to walk but not to run;
3. requiring a stick or other support;
4. confined to bed or chair;
5. requiring long-term respiratory support;
6. death.

The health-related quality of life (HRQL) after an attack of Guillain–Barré syndrome can be significantly impaired. About a fifth are unable to walk unaided after six months, and many experience chronic pain, fatigue, and difficulty with work, education, hobbies, and social activities. HRQL improves significantly in the first year.

== Epidemiology ==
In Western countries, the number of new episodes per year has been estimated to be between 0.89 and 1.89 cases per 100,000 people. Children and young adults are less likely to be affected than the elderly: the relative risk increases by 20% for every decade of life. Men are more likely to develop Guillain–Barré syndrome than women; the relative risk for men is 1.78 compared to women.

The distribution of subtypes varies between countries. In Europe and the United States, 60–80% of people with Guillain–Barré syndrome have the demyelinating subtype (AIDP), and AMAN affects only a small number (6–7%). In Asia and Central and South America, that proportion is significantly higher (30–65%). This may be related to the exposure to different kinds of infection, but also the genetic characteristics of that population. The Miller Fisher variant is thought to be more common in Southeast Asia.

== History ==
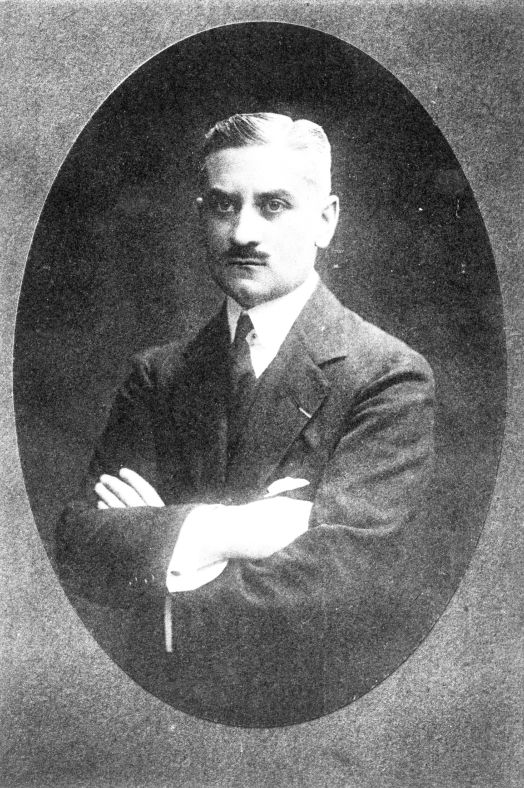
Georges Guillain, together with Barré and Strohl, described two cases of self-limiting acute paralysis with peculiar changes in the cerebrospinal fluid. He succeeded his teacher Pierre Marie as professor of neurology at the Salpêtrière hospital in Paris in 1925.

Jean-Baptiste Octave Landry first described the disorder in 1859. In 1916, Georges Guillain, Jean Alexandre Barré, and André Strohl diagnosed two soldiers with the illness and described the key diagnostic abnormality—albuminocytological dissociation—of increased spinal fluid protein concentration but a normal cell count.

C. Miller Fisher described the variant that bears his name in 1956. British neurologist Edwin Bickerstaff described the encephalitis type in 1951 and made further contributions with another paper in 1957. Guillain had reported on some of these features before their full description in 1938. Further subtypes have been described since then, such as the form featuring pure ataxia and the type causing pharyngeal-cervical-brachial weakness. The axonal subtype was first described in 1986.

Diagnostic criteria were developed in the late 1970s after the series of cases associated with swine flu vaccination. These were refined in 1990. The case definition was revised by the Brighton Collaboration for vaccine safety in 2009, but is mainly intended for research. Plasma exchange was first used in 1978, and its benefit was confirmed in larger studies in 1985. Intravenous immunoglobulins were introduced in 1988, and studies in the early 1990s demonstrated that they were no less effective than plasma exchange.

== Research directions ==
The understanding of the disease mechanism of Guillain–Barré syndrome has evolved in recent years. Development of new treatments has been limited since immunotherapy was introduced in the 1980s and 1990s. Current research is aimed at demonstrating whether some people who have received IVIg might benefit from a second course if the antibody levels measured in blood after treatment have shown only a small increase. Studies of the immunosuppressive drugs mycophenolate mofetil, brain-derived neurotrophic factor, and interferon beta (IFN-β) have not demonstrated benefit to support their widespread use.

An animal model (experimental autoimmune neuritis in rats) is often used for studies, and some agents have shown promise: glatiramer acetate, quinupramine, fasudil (an inhibitor of the Rho-kinase enzyme), and the heart drug flecainide. An antibody targeted against the anti-GD3 antiganglioside antibody has shown benefit in laboratory research. Given the role of the complement system in GBS, it has been suggested that complement inhibitors (such as the drug eculizumab) may be effective.

In animals, it is called acute polyradiculoneuritis or "coonhound paralysis", and may onset in the coonhound 7 to 10 days after transmission from raccoons. If the coonhound has not been around raccoons, the disease is called acute idiopathic polyradiculoneuritis.

== See also ==
- List of neurological conditions and disorders
- List of syndromes
