= Jean Landry (physician) =

French physician (1826–1865)

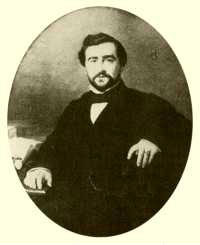
Jean Landry (1826–1865)

Jean Baptiste Octave Landry de Thézillat (10 October 1826 – October 1865) was a French medical doctor and medical researcher. He is credited with discovering the paralytic disorder Guillain–Barré syndrome (also known as Landry's ascending paralysis, but commonly known for Georges Guillain and Jean Alexandre Barré, who did later research on it.)

He was born in Limoges, Haute-Vienne in 1826, and became a doctor because it was the profession of his uncle. In the 1850s, he treated victims of cholera in Oise, a French department, and was involved in disease research from then on. In 1857, he married Claire Giustigniani (1832–1901), who lived on for 36 years after his death.

In 1859, he documented ten cases (five of his own, five he read about) of the disorder, and termed them "ascending paralysis". He noted three different forms:

- Ascending paralysis without sensory signs or symptoms.
- Ascending paralysis with concomitant anaesthesia and analgesia.
- Progressing generalised disorder with paralysis and sensory signs.

He died in Auteuil in 1865, having caught cholera from patients he was treating.

== Sources ==
- "Article on Dr. de Thézillat". whonamedit.com. Archived from the original on March 8, 2002.
- History of the disease
