= Jean Landry =

Jean Landry may refer to:

- Jean Landry (politician) (born 1948), politician from Quebec, Canada
- Jean Landry (ice hockey), (born 1953), Canadian ice hockey defenceman
- Jean Landry (physician) (1826–1865), French physician and medical researcher, responsible for discovering Guillain–Barré syndrome
