= Georges Guillain =

French neurologist (1876–1961)

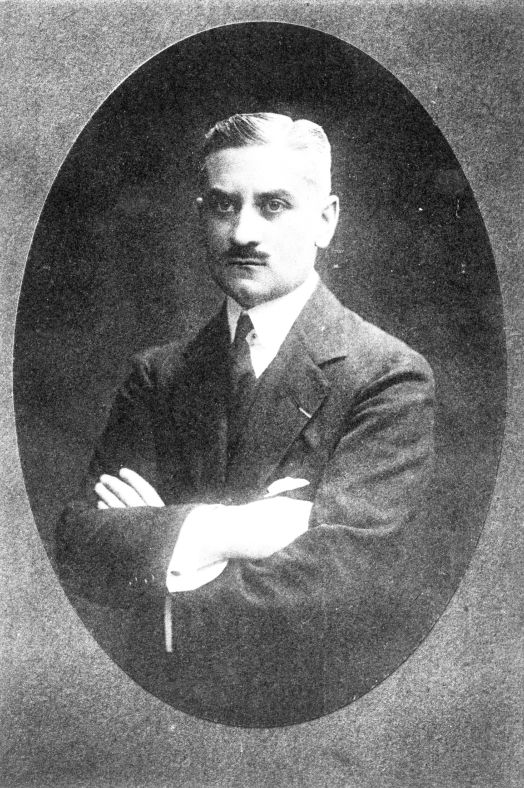
Georges Guillain

Georges Charles Guillain (French: [ɡilɛ̃]; 3 March 1876 – 29 June 1961) was a French neurologist born in Rouen.

== Biography ==
He studied medicine in Rouen and Paris, where he learned clinical education at several hospitals. He developed an interest in neurology, and his first important scientific work involved lesions of the plexus brachialis. He earned his medical doctorate at Paris in 1898.

He later became chef de clinique for nervous disease, and in 1910 acquired his agrégation. After the end of World War I, he worked at Charité Hospital in Paris, followed by a professorship of neurology at the Salpêtrière (1923).

Guillain was a prolific writer. In 1920 with his friend Jean Barré (1880-1967), he published a major work titled Travaux neurologiques de guerre, a book that described the two doctors' clinical experiences during wartime. He was a member of French, American and Japanese academies of science, and in 1949 was appointed commander of the Légion d'honneur. He died in Paris at age 85.

His daughter, Andrée, married the aircraft manufacturer Claude de Cambronne.

== Associated eponyms ==
- Guillain-Laroche-Léchelle reaction, a reaction to colloidal benzoin.
- Guillain–Barré–Strohl syndrome (ser André Strohl), the most common form of acquired inflammatory polyneuropathy.
- Guillain-Thaon syndrome, rare syndrome due to syphilis of the central nervous system.
