= Pronator drift =

Medical sign indicating palsy

In medicine, pronator drift (also known as pyramidal drift) refers to a pathologic sign seen during a neurological examination. Jean Alexandre Barré is credited with having first described it; thus it is sometimes known as the Barré test or sign. A positive result indicates palsy. This sign can appear due to an upper motor neuron lesion or various other conditions (including inborn errors of metabolism) which include palsy as a symptom.

== Description ==
Assessing for pronator drift helps to detect mild upper limb weakness in a patient who's awake and able to follow directions. Ask the patient to close the eyes, then to stretch out both arms in the appropriate position: Flex the shoulder joint to 90 degrees (45 degrees, if supine) and fully extend the elbow joint. The palms should be facing up (supinated). The patient should maintain this position for 20 to 30 seconds. Observe both arms. If the motor pathway is intact, the arms should remain in this position equally. Patients with a slight weakness in one arm won't be able to keep the affected arm raised, and ultimately the palm may begin to pronate (palm facing down). Pronator drift indicates abnormal function of the corticospinal tract in the contralateral hemisphere. In some patients, the arm may remain supinated but drop lower than the unaffected arm, and the fingers and elbow might flex.

The patient is asked to hold both arms at 90 degree flexion and elbows fully extended at shoulder level in front of them, with the palms upwards, and hold the position. If they are unable to maintain the position the result is positive. Closing the eyes accentuates the effect, because the brain is deprived of visual information about the position of the body and must rely on proprioception. Tapping on the palm of the outstretched hands can accentuate the effect.

=== Interpretation ===
This is a test of upper motor neuron function; a positive test indicates a neuronal deficit. New-onset pronator drift is widely considered to be a sign of acute ischemic stroke, and it is scored in the National Institutes of Health Stroke Scale.

If a forearm pronates, with or without downward motion, then the person is said to have pronator drift on that side reflecting a contralateral pyramidal tract lesion. In the presence of an upper motor neuron lesion, the supinator muscles in the upper limb are weaker than the pronator muscles, and as a result, the arm drifts downward and the palm turns toward the floor. A lesion in the ipsilateral cerebellum or ipsilateral dorsal column usually produces a drift upward, along with slow pronation of the wrist and elbow.
