= Ramsay Hunt syndrome =

Unrelated neurological syndromes

Three different neurological syndromes carry the name of Ramsay Hunt syndrome. Their only connection is that they were all first documented by the famous neurologist James Ramsay Hunt (1872–1937).

- Ramsay Hunt syndrome type 1, also called Ramsay Hunt cerebellar syndrome, is a rare form of cerebellar degeneration which involves myoclonic epilepsy, progressive ataxia, tremor, and a dementing process.
- Ramsay Hunt syndrome type 2 is the reactivation of herpes zoster in the geniculate ganglion. It is sometimes called herpes zoster oticus and has variable presentation which may include a lower motor neuron lesion of the facial nerve, deafness, vertigo, and pain. A triad of ipsilateral facial paralysis, ear pain, and vesicles on the face, on the ear, or in the ear is the typical presentation.
- Ramsay Hunt syndrome type 3 is a less commonly referenced condition, an occupationally induced neuropathy of the deep palmar branch of the ulnar nerve. It is also called Hunt's disease or artisan's palsy.
