= Bickerstaff brainstem encephalitis =

- Other names: BBE, Bickerstaff's encephalitis; Bickerstaff's syndrome.
- Specialty: Neurology
- Symptoms: Drowsiness, gait disturbances, and diplopia.
- Diagnostic method: Anamnestic, clinical, and radiological features.
- Differential diagnosis: Guillain-Barré syndrome and Miller-Fisher syndrome.
- Treatment: Immunotherapy.

Bickerstaff brainstem encephalitis is a rare inflammatory disorder of the central nervous system, first described by Edwin Bickerstaff in 1951. It may also affect the peripheral nervous system, and has features in common with both Miller Fisher syndrome and Guillain–Barré syndrome. The disorder typically develops days to weeks after an ordinary infection, most commonly the result of an infection or a gastrointestinal illness.

== Signs and symptoms ==
The most frequent initial symptoms of Bickerstaff brainstem encephalitis are drowsiness, gait disturbances, and double vision. Throughout the course of the disorder, almost every patient develops ataxia and external ophthalmoplegia. Most patients have disturbances of consciousness such as stupor, drowsiness, or coma. Babinski's sign, facial weakness, pupil abnormalities, bulbar palsy, and nystagmus are also commonly found. Symptoms tend to develop fairly quickly, within one to two days. There have been reports of dysesthesias and limb weakness as the presenting features of Bickerstaff brainstem encephalitis.

== Pathophysiology ==
The clinical features and course of the condition, the associated auto-antibodies against relevant antigens, and the response to treatment, all suggest that Bickerstaff brainstem encephalitis is an autoimmune disease. However, each of these criteria fails to fit a substantial proportion of patients, and there is no single test or feature that is diagnostic of Bickerstaff brainstem encephalitis. It is, therefore, possible that a proportion of cases are due to other causes, such as infection or lymphoma, but remain undiagnosed. It is also possible that there is more than one autoimmune disease that can cause an illness that would currently be diagnosed as Bickerstaff's. There is certainly overlap between Guillain–Barré syndrome, Miller Fisher syndrome and Bickerstaff brainstem encephalitis, as well as other conditions associated with anti-ganglioside antibodies, such as chronic ophthalmoplegia with anti-GQ1b antibody and the pharyngo-cervico-brachial variant of GBS.

== Diagnosis ==
Anti-GQ1b antibodies have been found in two-thirds of patients with this condition. This antibody is also found in almost all cases of Miller Fisher syndrome. The EEG is often abnormal, but shows only slow wave activity, which also occurs in many other conditions, and so is of limited value in diagnosis. Similarly, raised CSF protein levels and pleocytosis are frequent but non-specific. It was originally thought that raised CSF protein without pleocytosis ('albuminocytological dissociation') was a characteristic feature, as it is in Guillain–Barré syndrome, but this has not been supported in more recent work. In only 30% of cases is an MRI brain scan abnormal. Nerve conduction studies may show an axonal polyneuropathy.

== Treatment ==
Most patients reported in the literature have been given treatments suitable for autoimmune neurological diseases, such as plasmapheresis and/or intravenous immunoglobulin, and most have made a good recovery. The condition is too rare for controlled trials to have been undertaken.

== History ==
The first cases of Bickerstaff brainstem encephalitis were reported in 1951 by Cloake and Bickerstaff under the name "Mesencephalitis and rhombencephalitis". Edwin Bickerstaff named the disease "brainstem encephalitis" in 1957. The disorder has been known as Bickerstaff's brainstem encephalitis ever since 1978 when Edwin Bickerstaff wrote a review in the Handbook of Clinical Neurology under the name "Brain stem encephalitis (Bickerstaff's encephalitis)".

== See also ==
- Encephalitis
- Guillain–Barré syndrome
