= Jean Alexandre Barré =

French neurologist (1880–1967)

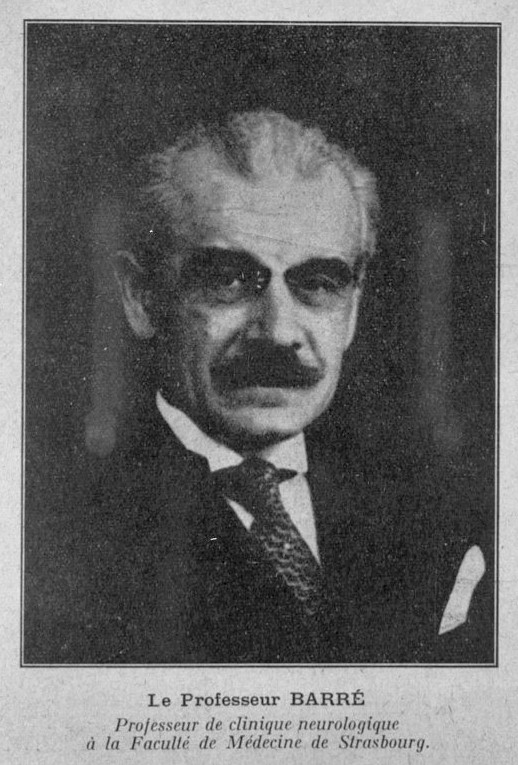
Jean Alexandre Barré

Jean Alexandre Barré (25 May 1880, Nantes – 26 April 1967, Strasbourg) was a French neurologist who in 1916 worked on the identification of Guillain-Barré-Strohl syndrome, as well as Barré–Liéou syndrome.

== Biography ==
=== First studies ===
He studied medicine in Nantes, afterwards serving his internship in Paris, where he was influenced by Joseph Babinski (1857–1932). In 1912 he obtained his medical doctorate with a thesis on osteoarthropathy associated with tabes dorsalis.

=== Guillain-Barré-Strohl syndrome ===
See also André Strohl.

During World War I, he worked in a neurological unit of the 6th army, directed by Georges Guillain (1876-1961), with whom he began a longtime collaboration. In 1919 he was appointed professor of neurology in Strasbourg.

He was especially interested in vestibular function and disorders associated with the vestibular system. He was founder of the journal Revue d’oto-neuro-ophtalmologie.

== Barré test ==
Barré is also credited with the "Barré Test" which may identify pronator drift or pyramidal drift, although the test was earlier described by Giovanni Mingazzini. This test is performed by making the patient stretch out their hands with the palms facing upwards, and then having the patient close their eyes. If one hand drops involuntarily (or drops after the physician taps on the patient's palms), the test indicates damage to the pyramidal tract. A maneuver that is sometimes used for examining the legs for latent pyramidal paresis is referred to as the "Mingazzini test" (named after Italian neurologist Giovanni Mingazzini 1859-1929).

== Written works ==
Barré was the author of over 800 scientific papers. With Guillain, he was co-author of Travaux neurologiques de guerre (1920), a book that was published in three editions. His doctoral thesis, Les osteo-arthropathies du tabès, was a continuation of Jean Charcot's research of the disorder. Barré died in 1967 at age 86.

== Bibliography ==
- "Jean Alexandre Barré". Who Named It. Archived from the original on November 22, 2019.
