= Multifocal motor neuropathy =

- Other names: Multifocal motor neuropathy with conduction block
- Specialty: Neurology

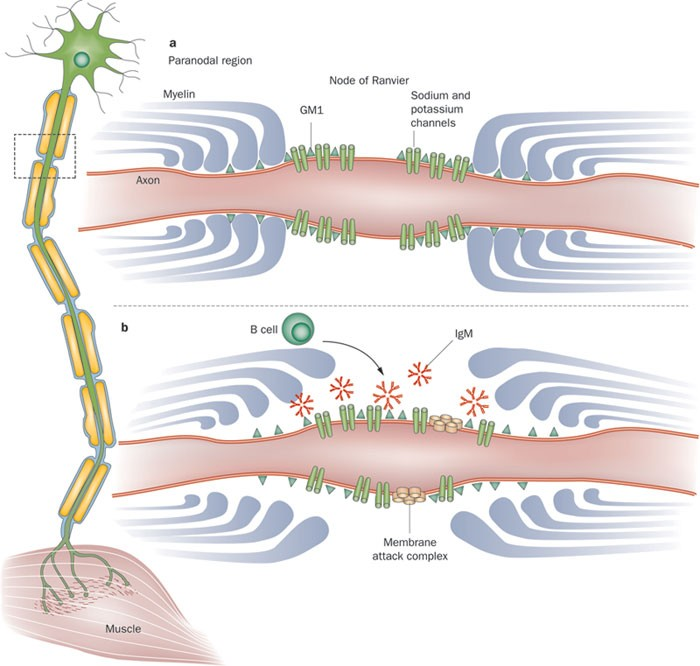
MMN scheme

Multifocal motor neuropathy (MMN) is a progressively worsening condition where muscles in the extremities gradually weaken. The disorder, a pure motor neuropathy syndrome, is sometimes mistaken for amyotrophic lateral sclerosis (ALS) because of the similarity in the clinical picture, especially if muscle fasciculations are present. MMN is thought to be autoimmune. It was first described in the mid-1980s.

Unlike ALS, which affects both upper and lower motor neuron pathways, MMN involves only the lower motor neuron pathway, specifically, the peripheral nerves emanating from the lower motor neurons. Definitive diagnosis is often difficult, and many MMN patients labor for months or years under an ALS diagnosis before finally getting a determination of MMN.

MMN usually involves very little pain; however, muscle cramps, spasms and twitches can cause pain for some people. MMN is not fatal, and does not diminish life expectancy. Many patients, once undergoing treatment, only experience mild symptoms over prolonged periods, though the condition remains slowly progressive. MMN can however, lead to significant disability, with loss of function in hands affecting ability to work and perform everyday tasks, and "foot drop" leading to inability to stand and walk; some patients end up using aids like canes, splints and walkers.

== Symptoms ==
Usually beginning in one or both hands, MMN is characterized by weakness, muscle atrophy, cramping, and often profuse fasciculations (muscle twitching). The symptoms are progressive over long periods, often in a stepwise fashion, but unlike ALS are often treatable.

Sensory nerves are usually unaffected.

Wrist drop and foot drop (leading to trips and falls) are common symptoms. Other effects can include gradual loss of finger extension, leading to a clawlike appearance. Cold & hot temperatures exacerbate MMN symptoms to such an extent, unlike other neuropathies, that this temperature response is being investigated as a diagnostic tool.

== Cause ==
MMN is thought to be caused by alterations in the immune system, such that certain proteins (antibodies) that would normally protect one from viruses and bacteria begin to attack constituents of peripheral nerves. Antibodies may be directed against "GM-1", a ganglioside found at the Nodes of Ranvier. These antibodies have been detected in at least one-third of MMN patients. More recent studies also suggest that newer tests for antibodies directed against GM-1, as well as a number of related gangliosides, are positive in over 80% of MMN patients. There are increasing reasons to believe these antibodies are the cause of MMN.

== Diagnosis ==
The diagnosis of MMN depends on demonstrating that a patient has a purely motor disorder affecting individual nerves, that there are no upper motor neuron (UMN) signs, that there are no sensory deficits, and that there is evidence of conduction block. These criteria are designed to differentiate the disorder from ALS (purely motor but with UMN signs), the Lewis-Sumner Syndrome variant of Chronic inflammatory demyelinating polyneuropathy (CIDP) (similar to MMN but usually with significant sensory loss), and "vasculitis" (a type of multiple mononeuropathy syndrome caused by inflammatory damage to the blood vessels in nerves that also causes sensory and motor symptoms).

A neurologist is usually needed to determine the diagnosis, which is based on the history and physical examination along with the electrodiagnostic study, which includes nerve conduction studies (NCS) and needle electromyography (EMG). The NCS usually demonstrate conduction block. This can be done by showing that the nerve signal cannot conduct past a "lesion" at some point along the nerve. For example, if the nerve is blocked in the forearm, an electrical impulse can easily get from the wrist to the hand if the stimulus is placed at the wrist. However, the signal will be blocked from reaching the hand if the stimulus is applied at the elbow. In MMN, sensory conduction along the same path should be normal. The EMG portion of the test looks for signals in the way muscles fire. In MMN it will most likely reveal abnormalities suggesting that some percentage of the motor axons has been damaged. Laboratory testing for GM1 antibodies is frequently done, and can be very helpful if they are abnormal. However, since only a third of patients with MMN have these antibodies, a negative test does not rule out the disorder. Spinal fluid examination is not usually helpful.

== Treatment ==
Multifocal motor neuropathy is normally treated by receiving intravenous immunoglobulin (IVIG), which can in many cases be highly effective, or immunosuppressive therapy with cyclophosphamide or rituximab. Steroid treatment (prednisone) and plasmapheresis are no longer considered to be useful treatments(not usually some pt highly recommended); prednisone can exacerbate symptoms. IVIg is the primary treatment, with about 80% of patients responding, usually requiring regular infusions at intervals of 1 week to several months. Other treatments are considered in case of lack of response to IVIg, or sometimes because of the high cost of immunoglobulin. Subcutaneous immunoglobulin is under study as a less invasive, more-convenient alternative to IV delivery.

Ongoing specialist community support, information, advice, and guidance is available from a range of Charities, Non-Government Organisations (NGOs), and Patient Advisory Groups around the world. In the United Kingdom this is provided by Inflammatory Neuropathies UK, in the USA it is provided by GBS/CIDP Foundation International, and in The European Union by a range of organisations under the umbrella of EPODIN (European Patient Organization for Disimmune & Inflammatory Neuropathies)
