= DFNY1 =

Genetic element in the species Homo sapiens

Identifiers
- Aliases: DFNY1, deafness, Y-linked 1
- External IDs: GeneCards: DFNY1
Orthologs
Databases	NCBI: entry
Species	Human	Mouse
Entrez	724074	n/a
Ensembl	n/a	n/a
UniProt	n a	n/a
RefSeq (mRNA)	n/a	n/a
RefSeq (protein)	n/a	n/a
Location (UCSC)	n/a	n/a
PubMed search		n/a
- Wikidata
View/Edit Human

Deafness, Y-linked 1 (DFNY1) is a protein that in humans is encoded by the DFNY1 gene. Y-linked hearing impairment (DFNY1, MIM 400043) is one of the few Mendelian disorders showing Y-linkage in humans.
