= Hopkins syndrome =

Neurological disorder

- Specialty: Neurology

Hopkins syndrome is a neurological disorder, first reported in 1974. Its cause has not been established, but its association with asthma exacerbations (usually with a respiratory infection as a trigger) has led to suspicion that the initial viral insult that causes the respiratory infection is also implicated in the subsequent paralysis. Herpes simplex virus type I DNA has been found in the cerebrospinal fluid of at least one patient diagnosed with Hopkins syndrome. In several cases, anti-viral antibody titers for echovirus, enterovirus, coxsackievirus and poliovirus types 1, 2 and 3 were specifically sought; all were negative.^{,} There is one reported case in which Mycoplasma pneumoniae infection was found in the patient.

The syndrome appears to involve the spinal cord: specifically, the anterior horn cells subserving the affected muscles are often damaged. The evidence for anterior horn cell involvement comes from radiological^{,}^{,} and electromyographical studies. In one case, a biopsy of an affected muscle "revealed scattered atrophic fibers, indicating lesions in the anterior horn cells of the spinal cord".

As the illness is rare, no treatments have been subjected to a randomized controlled trial. Acyclovir, steroids and therapeutic plasma exchange have been tried; one report suggests that the latter is more effective than steroidal therapy. The prognosis for recovery of function of the affected limbs is generally considered to be poor.
