= Facial weakness =

- Specialty: Neurology

Facial weakness is a medical sign associated with a variety of medical conditions.

Some specific conditions associated with facial weakness include:

- Stroke
- Neurofibromatosis
- Bell's palsy
- Ramsay Hunt syndrome
- Spontaneous cerebrospinal fluid leak
- Myasthenia gravis

== See also ==
- Acute facial nerve paralysis
- Facioscapulohumeral muscular dystrophy
