= André Strohl =

French physiologist

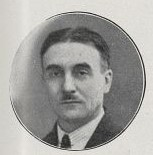
André Strohl in 1928

André Strohl (20 March 1887 – 10 March 1977) was a French physiologist who was a native of Poitiers. He is remembered for his role in the diagnosis of Guillain–Barré syndrome (sometimes called Guillain–Barré–Strohl syndrome), a form of areflexic paralysis that exhibits normal cell count but with an abnormal increase in spinal fluid protein. The syndrome is named after two French neurologists; Georges Guillain and Jean Alexandre Barré.

In 1916, during World War I, Strohl was serving in the Neurological Centre of the French Sixth Army with Guillain and Barré. The three doctors noticed that two soldiers, who were suffering from muscular weakening and pain along with paresthesias, had an unexpected amount of spinal fluid protein production. Strohl is credited with performing the electrophysiological tests on the soldiers. Eventually, the two patients were able to recover from their illness. In 1916, Guillain, Barré and Strohl reported their findings in a medical journal. In 1927, H. Draganesco and J. Claudion coined the term "Guillain–Barré syndrome", apparently overlooking Strohl's contributions.

In 1924 Strohl became a professor of physiological medicine in Algiers, and two years later acquired the same position at the University of Paris. He retired from there in 1957. He was also a member of the Académie Nationale de Médecine.

== Selected bibliography ==
- G. Guillain, J. A. Barré, A. Strohl: Le réflexe médico-plantaire: Étude de ses caracteres graphiques et de son temps perdu. Bulletins et mémoires de la Société des Médecins des Hôpitaux de Paris, 1916, 40: 1459-1462.
- G. Guillain, J. A. Barré, A. Strohl: Sur un syndrome de radiculonévrite avec hyperalbuminose du liquide céphalo-rachidien sans réaction cellulaire. Remarques sur les caractères cliniques et graphiques des réflexes tendineux. Bulletins et mémoires de la Société des Médecins des Hôpitaux de Paris, 1916, 40: 1462-1470.
