= Cytomegalic inclusion body disease =

- Other names: Cytomegalic inclusion disease
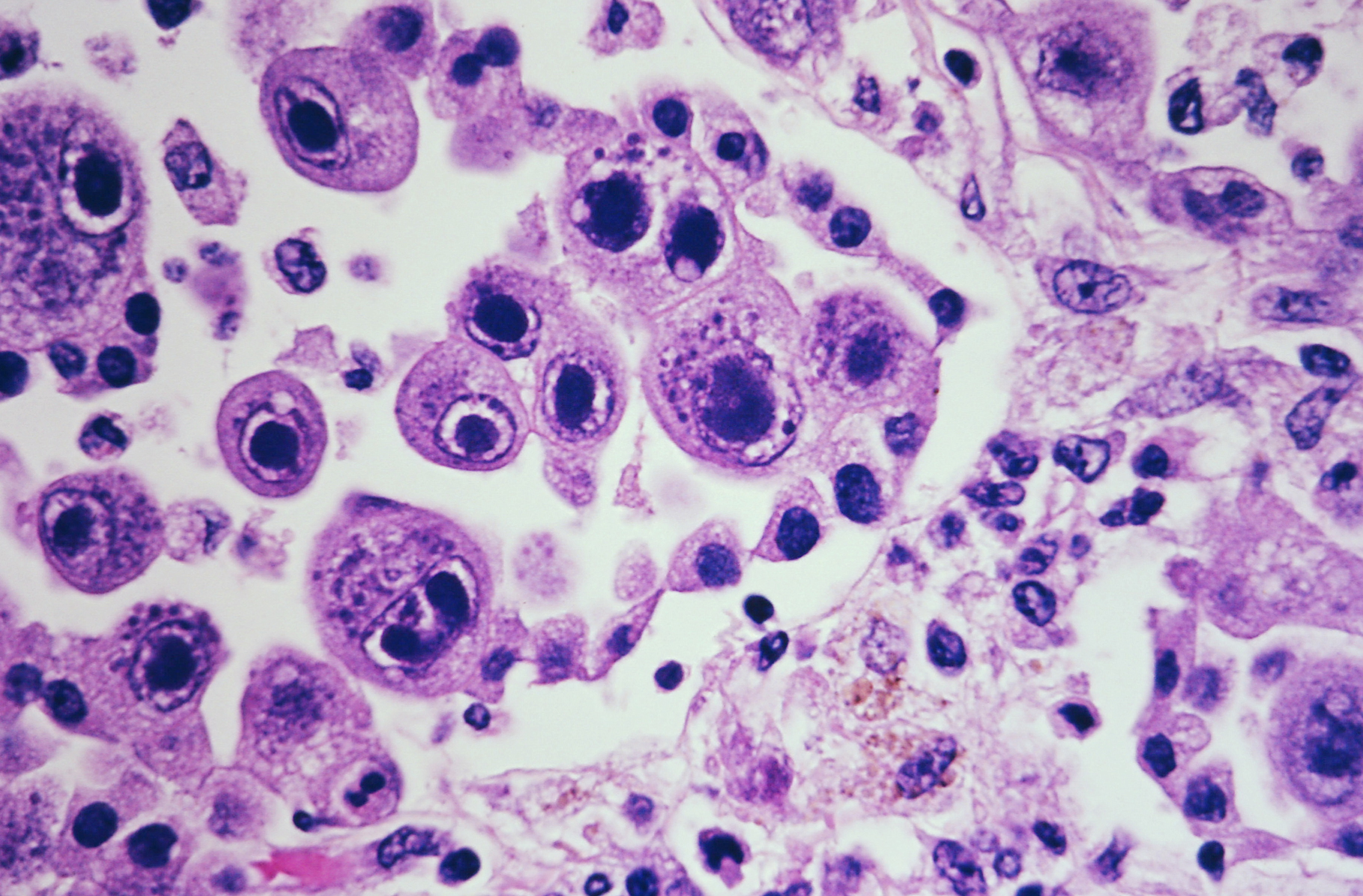
- Cytomegalovirus infection - Case 301
- Differential diagnosis: Cytomegalovirus infection

Cytomegalic inclusion body disease (CIBD) also known as cytomegalic inclusion disease (CID) is a series of signs and symptoms caused by cytomegalovirus infection, toxoplasmosis or other rare infections such as herpes or rubella viruses. It can produce massive calcification of the central nervous system, and often the kidneys.

Cytomegalic inclusion body disease is the most common cause of congenital abnormalities in the United States. It can also cause pneumonia and other diseases in immunocompromised patients, such as those with HIV/AIDS or recipients of organ transplants.

== Symptoms and signs ==
Early in infancy, hepatosplenomegaly, jaundice, hemolytic anemia, thrombocytopenia purpura, pneumonitis, chorioretinitis, and central nervous system (CNS) disease are among the numerous clinical presentations of congenital cytomegalic inclusion disease (CID). Several studies have highlighted the mental and motor retardation caused by chronic intrauterine encephalitis.

The brain, pituitary gland, spleen, thyroid, pancreas, liver, lungs, and kidneys are the vital structures that are most frequently affected. The disease is marked by progressive severe pneumonitis in the few questionable cases reported in adults.

== Diagnosis ==
The diagnosis of cytomegalic inclusion disease was initially made only after histologic examination of postmortem tissue or by liver biopsy; later, the possibility of a premortem diagnosis was demonstrated by the demonstration of inclusion bodies in cells exfoliated in urine or gastric washings. However, the importance of cellular inclusions in urinary sediment in the diagnosis of systemic cytomegalic inclusion-body disease isn't always consistent.
