= Miller Fisher syndrome =

Guillain-Barre syndrome that manifests as a descending paralysis

Miller Fisher syndrome is a variant of Guillain-Barré syndrome characterized by a triad of symptoms including gait instability and coordination problems (ataxia), decreased reflexes or no reflexes (areflexia), and impaired eye movement (ophthalmoplegia). This constellation of symptoms was first noted in a small group of patients by Miller Fisher in 1956 following an infection.

== Signs and symptoms ==
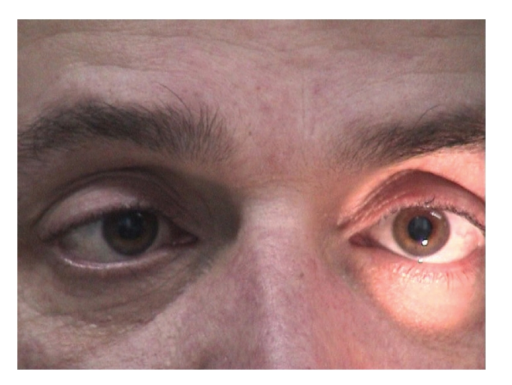
Photo of eyes of a person with Miller Fisher Syndrome demonstrating bilaterally enlarged pupils and failure of the left pupil to constrict in response to light (impaired pupillary light reflex).

Historically, Miller Fisher syndrome has been characterized by gait instability and poor coordination (ataxia), decreased reflexes or no reflexes (areflexia), and impaired eye movement (ophthalmoplegia). Within a couple of weeks, the weakness of the eye muscles (ophthalmoparesis), which usually affects both eyes, may progress to full ophthalmoplegia. Diminished reflexes may or may not be present, with as many as 18% of cases occurring without the symptom, and it may be confined to a single body part. Some people may retain normal reflexes while others may experience hyperactive reflexes. Other symptoms may include weakness in the face (facial nerve palsy), eyelid drooping (ptosis), muscle weakness (hyposthenia), and sensory problems.

Changes to the pupillary reflex have been noted, and pupils may also appear fixed and dilated in people diagnosed with Miller Fisher syndrome.

== Causes ==
Miller Fisher syndrome is often preceded by an infection, and recent reviews have noted that upper respiratory infections have previously occurred in 56-76% of people who were later diagnosed with Miller Fisher syndrome. Infection of the gastrointestinal tract has also been noted as the preceding infection in roughly 4% of people later diagnosed with Miller Fisher syndrome. Campylobacter jejuni and Haemophilus influenzae are two types of bacteria that have been implicated in infections preceding Miller Fisher syndrome, although the majority of cases were preceded by an infection from an unknown pathogen.

An increased risk for developing Miller Fisher syndrome has also been noted following bone marrow transplants, certain surgical procedures, use of TNF-alpha antagonists, and use of heroin, streptokinase, and isotretinoin.

== Pathophysiology ==
Miller Fisher syndrome is believed to be the result of molecular mimicry. Some pathogens responsible for the infection that precedes Miller Fisher syndrome have lipooligosaccharides on their membranes. These pathogen lipooligosaccharides are similar in structure to gangliosides on the myelin nerve sheaths of human hosts. The host’s immune system produces antibodies against the bacterial lipooligosaccharides, but these antibodies ultimately mistake the host’s ganglioside for the pathogen’s lipooligosaccharides and cross-react with the host’s gangliosides, leading to various symptoms.

In the case of Miller Fisher syndrome, GQ1b is a specific ganglioside found most abundantly in the myelin of nerves responsible for eye movement (oculomotor nerves), neuromuscular spindle fibers, and dorsal root ganglia. Antibodies in the host’s immune system encounter the host’s GQ1b gangliosides, mistake them for the pathogen’s lipooligosaccharides and bind to the host’s GQ1b gangliosides, ultimately leading to various dysfunctions in these nerves. As such, testing for Miller Fisher syndrome may include evaluation of the serum for anti-GQ1b antibodies, which have been found to be present in roughly 85% of people diagnosed with Miller Fisher syndrome.

Levels of anti-GQ1b antibodies are highest during the early stages of Miller Fisher syndrome, and higher levels of anti-GQ1b antibodies have been found to be associated with increased severity of illness.

== Diagnosis ==
Historically, the diagnosis of Miller Fisher syndrome was clinical and based on the recognition of a triad of symptoms including poor coordination and gait instability (ataxia), decreased reflexes or no reflexes (areflexia), and impaired eye movement (ophthalmoplegia). However, the discovery of anti-GQ1b antibodies led to a classification of Miller Fisher syndrome as part of a group of anti-GQ1b antibody-related conditions. As such, anti-GQ1b antibody testing may be used to support clinical findings when a person presents with a history and symptoms suggestive of Miller Fisher syndrome.

Other conditions may resemble some of the symptoms of Miller Fisher syndrome. Conditions that share some of the core symptoms associated with Miller Fisher syndrome include myasthenia gravis, brainstem stroke, botulism, rhombencephalitis (due to inflammatory or infectious causes), and basal meningitis.

== Treatment ==
Miller Fisher syndrome is usually self-limiting in uncomplicated cases. 92 people with Miller Fisher syndrome were included in one retrospective study that looked at treatment with plasma exchange, intravenous immunoglobulin, and no treatment. The study noted a 100% survival rate for these people regardless of treatment type. Except for cases involving radicular or nerve (neuropathic) pain, treatment with steroids does not appear to provide any therapeutic benefit when compared to supportive care.

Severe cases of Miller Fisher syndrome may include difficulty breathing or swallowing, and in such cases, these patients may benefit from treatment with intravenous immunoglobulin or plasma exchange therapy (PLEX). People diagnosed with Miller Fisher syndrome may also benefit from occupational therapy and physical therapy.

== Prognosis ==
A recent narrative review noted various time points for recovery from symptoms, with diminished reflexes (areflexia) being the most variable in terms of time to recovery. Many patients experience resolution of their symptoms within approximately 4 weeks. On average, after six months, all patients diagnosed with Miller Fisher syndrome were able to complete their regular daily activities without limitations and had experienced resolution of associated decreased reflexes, gait instability, and impaired eye movement. Miller Fisher syndrome has been found to have a case fatality rate lower than 5%.

In rare cases, some people diagnosed with Miller Fisher syndrome may experience difficulty breathing or other symptoms typically associated with Guillain-Barré syndrome and may require mechanical ventilation. Such severe symptoms occur more often with other types of anti-GQ1B antibody syndromes, including Bickerstaff brainstem encephalitis and Guillain-Barré syndrome with ophthalmoplegia (GBS-O), and as such, close observation may be necessary for people diagnosed with these sub-types.

== Classification ==
The discovery of the anti-GQ1B antibody helped refine the classification of Miller Fisher syndrome as essentially one of several conditions considered to be part of a spectrum of anti-GQ1B antibody syndromes. Other sub-types of anti-GQ1B antibody syndromes include Bickerstaff brainstem encephalitis, acute ophthalmoplegia without ataxia, and Guillain-Barré syndrome with ophthalmoplegia (GBS-O). Atypical sub-types include two forms that do not present with ophthalmoplegia and include optic neuropathy and acute vestibular syndrome. Another atypical subtype of anti-GQ1B antibody syndromes includes acute sensory ataxic neuropathy.

== Epidemiology ==
Miller Fisher syndrome can occur at any age but has an average age of occurrence of 36 and has a slightly increased prevalence in males. Miller Fisher syndrome has also been found to have an increased incidence in Taiwan, Hong Kong, and Thailand.

== History ==
Miller Fisher syndrome was first described by the physician Charles Miller Fisher in a paper titled “An Unusual Variant of Acute Idiopathic Polyneuritis (Syndrome of Ophthalmoplegia, Ataxia and Areflexia),” which was published in the New England Journal of Medicine in 1956. In this work, he described 3 patients who were experiencing poor coordination and gait instability (ataxia), diminished reflexes (areflexia), and impaired eye movement (ophthalmoplegia) as part of a neurological condition.
