= Edwin Bickerstaff =

British neurologist

Edwin Robert Bickerstaff (20 November 1920 – 23 November 2007), was a British neurologist. He is best remembered for describing Bickerstaff's encephalitis and a subtype of migraine (basilar migraine) that is sometimes called "Bickerstaff's migraine".
