= James Ramsay Hunt =

American neurologist (1872–1937)

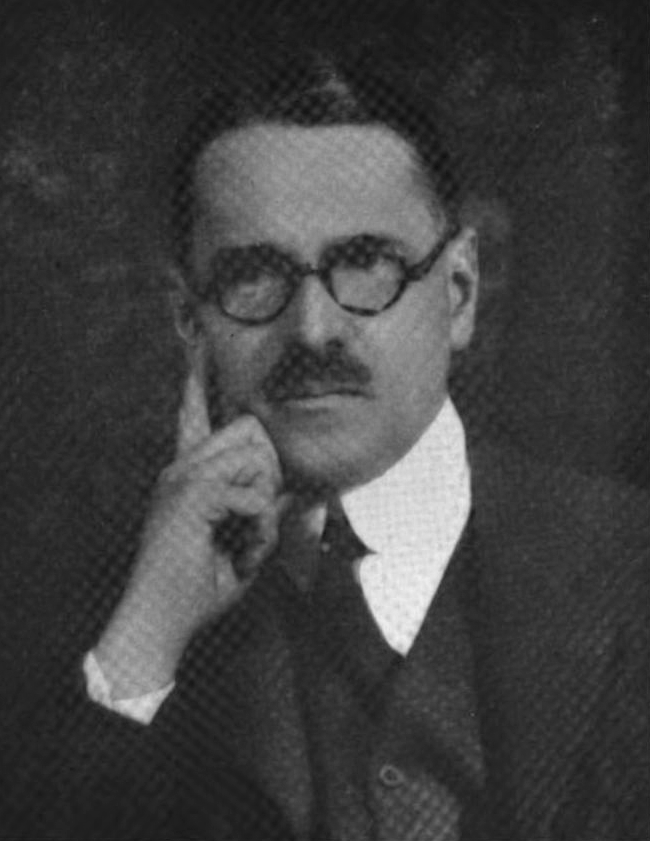
- Born: 1872; Philadelphia, Pennsylvania, U.S.
- Died: July 22, 1937 (aged 64–65); Katonah, New York, U.S.
- Education: University of Pennsylvania School of Medicine
- Occupation: Neurologist
- Spouse: Alice St. John Nolan (m. 1908)
- Children: 2

James Ramsay Hunt (1872 – July 22, 1937) was an American neurologist.

== Early life and education ==
James Ramsay Hunt was born in Philadelphia in 1872. He received his M.D. degree from the University of Pennsylvania School of Medicine in 1893. He then studied in Paris, Vienna, and Berlin, and returned to practice neurology in New York, working at Cornell University Medical School from 1900 to 1910 with Charles Loomis Dana. In 1910, he joined the faculty at the Columbia University College of Physicians and Surgeons and what later became their Neurological Institute of New York. He did major research on the anatomy and disorders of the corpus striatum and the extrapyramidal system, and described several movement disorders. He was consulting physician at several New York hospitals, including Lenox Hill Hospital, New York Hospital, Babies Hospital, the New York Eye and Ear Infirmary, the Psychiatric Institute, Letchworth Village for Mental Defectives, Montefiore Hospital, and the Craig Colony for Epileptics, and was appointed professor of neurology at Columbia in 1924.

== 1920–1934 ==
He served as president of the American Neurologic Association in 1920, the New York Neurologic Society in 1929, the American Psychopathological Society in 1932, and the Association for Research in Nervous and Mental Disorders in 1934. He was also a founder of the American Society for Clinical Investigation, and a member of the Association of American Physicians, the American Psychiatric Association, the Association for the Study of Internal Secretions, and the American Medical Association.

== World War I ==
During World War I, he was a lieutenant and later a lieutenant colonel in the Army Medical Corps, and served in France as a director of neuropsychiatry.

== Syndromes ==
Hunt described three discrete syndromes, the best known of which is herpes zoster oticus, also known as Ramsay Hunt syndrome type 2.

== Personal life ==
He married Chicagoan Alice St. John Nolan in 1908, and was survived by two children, James Ramsay Hunt Jr. and Alice St. John Hunt.

== Other associated eponyms ==
- Ramsay Hunt's atrophy: a term for wasting of the small muscles of the hands without sensory loss.
- Ramsay Hunt's zone: a delimited skin area supplied by the ganglion geniculi of the nervus intermedius.
- Ramsay Hunt's paralysis: a disturbance with symptoms resembling those of Parkinsonism, but less intense than in Parkinson's disease.

== See also ==
- Ramsay Hunt syndrome
