= Ramsay Hunt syndrome type 1 =

- Specialty: Neurology

Ramsay Hunt syndrome type 1 is a rare, degenerative, neurological disorder characterized by myoclonus epilepsy, intention tremor, progressive ataxia and occasionally cognitive impairment

It has also been alternatively called dyssynergia cerebellaris myoclonica, dyssynergia cerebellaris progressiva, dentatorubral degeneration, or Ramsay Hunt cerebellar syndrome.

== Presentation ==
Onset of symptoms usually occurs in early adulthood and is characterized by intention tremor, progressive ataxia, convulsions, and myoclonic epileptic jerks. Tremors usually affect one extremity, primarily the upper limb, and eventually involve the entire voluntary motor system. Overall, the lower extremity is usually disturbed less often than the upper extremity. Additional features of the syndrome include: an unsteady gait, seizures, muscular hypotonia, reduced muscular coordination, asthenia, adiadochokinesia and errors with estimating range, direction, and force of voluntary movements. Mental deterioration can, rarely, occur.

== Causes ==
Ramsay Hunt syndrome type 1 is caused by the impairment of a regulatory mechanism between cerebellar and brainstem nuclei and has been associated with a wide range of diseases, including Lafora disease, dentatorubropallidoluysian atrophy, and celiac disease.

== Diagnosis ==
The diagnosis of Ramsay Hunt syndrome type 1 is different to individual people with the syndrome.

== Treatment ==
Treatment of Ramsay Hunt syndrome type 1 is specific to individual symptoms. Myoclonus and seizures may be treated with drugs like valproate. Some have described this condition as difficult to characterize.

== Eponym ==
It is named for James Ramsay Hunt, who first described a form of progressive cerebellar dyssynergia associated with myoclonic epilepsy in 1921.
