= Antiganglioside antibodies =

Antibodies that react to self-gangliosides

Autoantibody
Anti-ganglioside
Common autoantibody characteristics
Triggering agent(s)	Campylobacter jejuni (Major) Mycoplasma pneumoniae (Minor) Coeliac Disease(Rare)
Isoform specific
autoantibody characteristics
Autoantigen; Isoform	Ganglioside D3 (GD3)
Affected Organ(s)	Muscle
Affected Cells(s)	motor nerve terminal (nodes of Ranvier)
Associated; Disease(s)	Guillain–Barré syndrome
Autoantibody class	IgA
Autoantigen; Isoform	Ganglioside M1 (GM1)
Associated; Disease(s)	prodromal diarrhea
Autoantibody class	IgG
IgG Subclass	IgG1, IgG3, IgG4
Autoantigen; Isoform	Ganglioside Q1b (GQ1b)
Affected Cells(s)	Schwann cells
Associated; Disease(s)	Miller-Fisher Syndrome

Antiganglioside antibodies that react to self-gangliosides are found in autoimmune neuropathies. These antibodies were first found to react with cerebellar cells. These antibodies show highest association with certain forms of Guillain–Barré syndrome.

== Antibodies to ganglioside subtypes ==
Autoantigenic gangliosides that are currently known are GD3, GM1, GQ3 and GT1.

=== Anti-GD3 ===
Anti-GD3 antibodies have been found in association with specific forms of Guillain–Barré syndrome. In vivo studies of isolated anti-GM1 and GD3 antibodies indicate the antibodies can interfere with motor neuron function. Anti-GD1a antibodies were highly associated acute motor axonal neuropathy while high titers of anti-GM1 were more frequent indicating that GD1a possibly targets the axolemma and nodes of Ranvier most of the Ab+ patients had C. jejuni infections. Patients with Anti-GalNAc-GD1a antibodies were less common but had more severe disease (rapidly progressive, predominantly distal weakness).

=== Anti-GM1 ===
Levels of anti-GM1 antibodies are elevated in patients with various forms of dementia. Antibodies levels correlate with more severe Guillain–Barré syndrome. Levels of anti-GM1 antibodies are especially elevated in patients with prodromal diarrhea. Titers to GM1 in other diseases (rheumatoid arthritis, primary Sjögren's syndrome and systemic lupus erythematosus) was also elevated. Additionally highly significant association was found with rheumatoid arthritis and peripheral neuropathies. Conflicting evidence suggests no significant elevation in motor neuron neuropathy but marginally elevated IgA in sensory neuron neuropathies. The autoimmune role of anti-GM1 is still unclear. Multifocal motor neuropathy (MMN) with conduction block is closely related to CIDP (chronic inflammatory demyelinating polyneuropathy). Anti-GM1 antibodies are positive in around 80% of cases. MMN will present with asymmetrical motor neuropathy where reflexes are usually preserved (or slightly increased), affecting upper limb more than lower limb. MMN is potentially treatable with immunomodulation.

=== Anti-GQ1b ===
Anti-GQ1b were typically described in Miller-Fisher syndrome. This presents with the classical triad of ataxia, areflexia and ophthalmoplegia. The clinical spectrum of disorders associated with anti-GQ1b now is also recognized to include, Bickerstaff brainstem encephalitis, Guillain-Barré syndrome with ophthalmoplegia, and acute ophthalmoplegia without ataxia. Studies of these antibodies reveal large disruption of the Schwann cells.

== Triggering agents ==
Microbial agents include: Campylobacter jejuni and Mycoplasma pneumoniae.

=== Campylobacter jejuni ===
Antibodies to a GM1 epitope as well as to one with the GT1a or GD3 epitope were found in different strains of Campylobacter jejuni and patients with Guillain–Barré syndrome have a high occurrence of C. jejuni infection. Many studies indicate that C. jejuni may be causative for a subset of some forms of neuropathies.

=== Coeliac disease ===
Antibodies to ganglioside are found to be elevated in coeliac disease. Recent studies show that gliadin can cross-link to gangliosides in a transglutaminase independent manner, indicating that gliadin specific T-cell could present these antigens to the immune system.

== Immunoglobin isotypes ==
IgG. In multiple sclerosis, antibodies to GM1 are dominated by the IgG1, IgG3 and IgG4. Also anti-GM1 IgG has been identified in Guillain–Barré syndrome or chronic inflammatory demyelinating polyradiculoneuropathy. while controlled studies failed to find any significant association with Motor neuron disease.
IgA. IgA to gangliosides have been observed in Guillain–Barré syndrome.
IgM. IgM antibodies have been detected in early work, but their significance in disease is controversial.
