= Giovanni Mingazzini =

Italian neurologist (1859–1929)

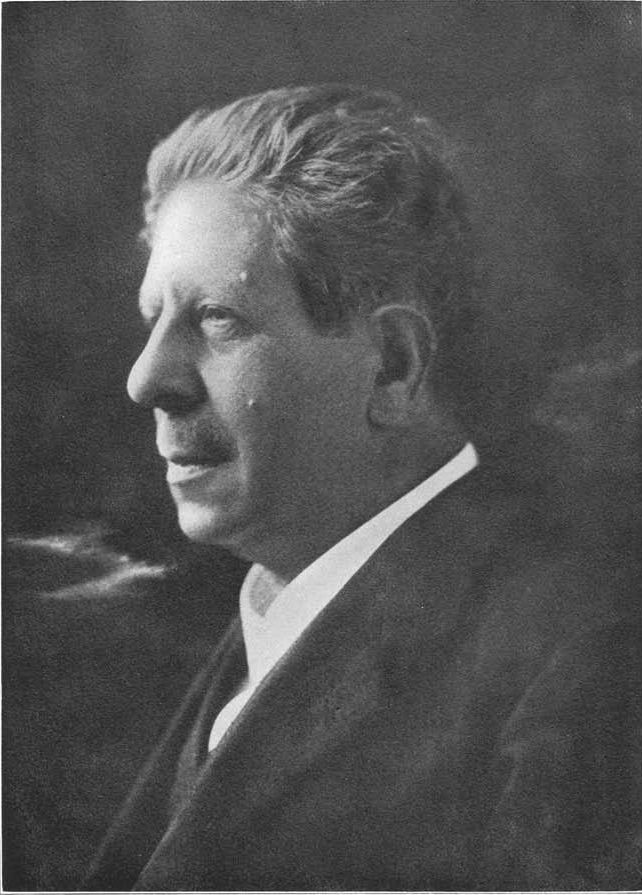
Giovanni Mingazzini (1859-1929)

Giovanni Mingazzini (15 February 1859, Ancona – 3 December 1929) was an Italian neurologist.

He trained at the institute of physiology in Rome with Jacob Moleschott (1822-1893), followed by work as an assistant to anatomist Francesco Todaro (1839-1918). Afterwards, he studied neuroanatomy in Munich with Bernhard von Gudden (1824-1886). In 1895 he was appointed professor of psychiatry and neurology at the University of Rome.

Known for his anatomical research of the nervous system, he made important contributions in studies of aphasia, the physiology of the lenticular nucleus, and investigations of the cerebellum and corpus callosum. In his analysis on the origin of motor aphasia, he proposed an hypothesis that opposed the views espoused by Pierre Marie (1853-1940).

His work on obsessive forms of collecting in the paper "Collezionismo nelle diverse forme psicopatiche" (1893) anticipates the contemporary diagnostic criteria of hoarding disorder.

When Benito Mussolini came to power in Italy, Mingazzini refused to sign allegiance to Fascism, thus risking deportation to Sardinia. He died on 3 December 1929 of a heart attack.

== Associated eponyms ==
- Mingazzini test: A manoeuvre deployed for finding latent pyramidal paresis of the legs.
- Mingazzini's field: Anatomical region in front of the left lentiform nucleus where fibers from Broca's area join with the corresponding region in the contralateral hemisphere. Term coined by Swedish neurologist Salomon Eberhard Henschen (1847-1930).
