= Hirayama disease =

Rare motor neuron disease

- Other names: Juvenile muscular atrophy of distal upper extremity, Hirayama disease, spinal muscular atrophy juvenile nonprogressive
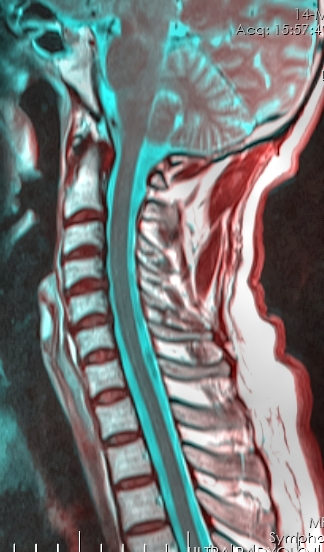
- Cervical spine

Hirayama disease, also known as monomelic amyotrophy (MMA), is a rare motor neuron disease first described in 1959 in Japan. Its symptoms usually appear about two years after adolescent growth spurt and is significantly more common in males, with an average age of onset between 15 and 25 years. Hirayama disease is reported most frequently in Asia but has a global distribution. It is typically marked by insidious onset of muscle atrophy of an upper limb, which plateaus after two to five years from which it neither improves nor worsens. There is no pain or sensory loss. It is not believed to be hereditary.

Both the names for the disorder and its possible causes have been evolving since first reported in 1959. It is most commonly believed the condition occurs by asymmetrical compression of the cervical spinal column by the cervical dural sac, especially when the neck is flexed. However, the disease is uncommon and diagnosis is confused by several atypical reports.

== Symptoms ==
In terms of the signs and symptoms that are consistent for an individual who has monomelic amyotrophy are the following (although this does not reflect a complete list):

- Muscle weakness
- Fasciculations
- Tremor
- Cold hands
- Muscle cramps
- Atrophy of hand and forearm
- Muscle Loss
- Sharp pains (from neck to hand)

Initially most people notice weakness in one hand; they may feel contracture of middle and ring finger and notice a thinning of the subdigital palm of the affected fingers. Progress of the condition varies, and weakness in the arm ranges from minimal to significant. Fasciculations are uncommon (>20%); increased weakness under cold conditions is commonly reported (cold paresis).

In less frequent cases, the symptoms may also affect the lower extremities, e.g. weakness in a leg.

== Cause ==
The disability originates with impaired functioning of the anterior horn cells of the lower cervical cord (lower neck). Researchers, including Hirayama, believe that "forward displacement of the cervical dural sac and compressive flattening of the lower cervical cord during neck flexion" is the contributing factor. Studies consistently note a loss of normal neck curvature (the cervical lordosis) and compression of the cervical chord by the dural sac in forward flexion. Recent studies agree with Hirayama's hypothesis that the disease is caused by "ischemic injury of the cervical anterior horn and/or nerve root caused by excessive forward displacement of the posterior dura during neck flexion". The injury itself likely is facilitated by an atypical, disproportionate growth of the spinal cord and vertebral canal during a growth spurt in young adolescents, leading to cervical cord compression when the neck is flexed.

Note that initially, the cause of the decline was not fully understood and considered unknown. For instance, there was "a debate about whether this condition represents a focal form of primary LMN degeneration (ie, a focal form of spinal muscular atrophy) or a local consequence of chronic compression from a dural expansion in the cervical spine." However, "genetics studies demonstrated there is no survival motor neuron (SMN) gene deletion in [Hirayama disease] patients"

similarly, there also is "no superoxide dismutase 1 gene deletion" as in patients with amyotrophic lateral sclerosis (ALS). Therefore, and due to its relatively good clinical prognosis, researchers have established Hirayama disease as a new entity that differs from spinal muscular atrophy, amyotrophic lateral sclerosis, and other motor neuron diseases.

A familial link has been found in a minor percentage of cases, including parent-child and sibling-sibling. Because of the unusual distribution of the disease, some researchers speculate that there could be an ethnic link.

== Diagnosis ==
The condition presents almost exclusively in 15- to 25-year-old adults experiencing weakness in hand and arm. A patient history and a neurological exam narrows down the possible diagnosis; this preliminary exam typically includes strength and reflex tests. Cold paresis (increased weakness in cold weather) is reported by most patients (> 80%). Fasciculations are reported as uncommon (< 20%) to common; larger tremors are more consistently cited. Males are far more likely to be diagnosed with the condition. (Note: The male to female ratio most commonly given is 10:1, but varies markedly in studies, from 5:2 (Bademkiran et al 2015) to 20:1 (Jin et al 2014))

The disease is rare and several cited cases deviate from the expected norm, making diagnosis more difficult. Proposed diagnostic criteria:

1. Distal predominant muscle weakness and atrophy in forearm and hand
2. Involvement of the unilateral upper extremity almost always all the time
3. Onset between the ages of 10 and early 20s
4. Insidious onset with gradual progression for the first several years, followed by stabilization
5. No lower extremity involvement
6. No sensory disturbance and tendon reflex abnormalities
7. Exclusion of other diseases (e.g., motor neuron disease, multifocal motor neuropathy, brachial plexopathy, spinal cord tumors, syringomyelia, cervical vertebral abnormalities, anterior interosseous, or deep ulnar neuropathy)

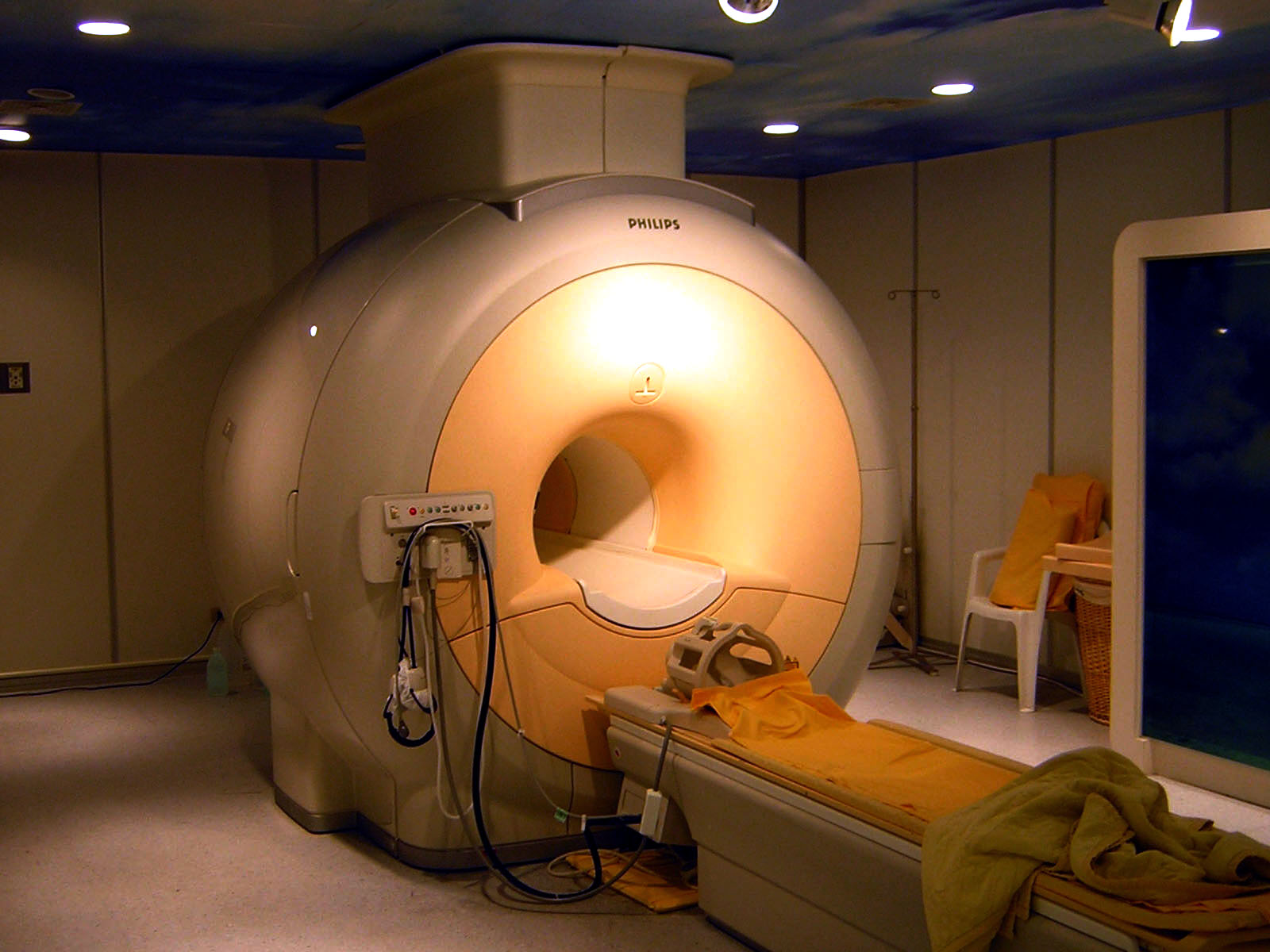
MRI

A neurological exam can suggest different motor neuron diseases (such as MMA), but to more confidently distinguish MMA from the diseases it mimics, advanced diagnostic tools are called for. These include exam tools such as magnetic resonance imaging (MRI), and electromyography (EMG) and nerve conduction velocity (NCV) tests. An MRI examination of the neck would typically reveal—for a positive MMA diagnosis—some constriction of the cervical cord and an abnormal forward extension of the neck, ("loss of cervical lordosis"); pressure by the dura on the nerve cord apparently causes the flattening / narrowing. An EMG test reveals loss of the nerve supply, or denervation, in the affected limb without a conduction block (a nerve blockage restricted to a small segment of the nerve).

In early stages of the disease MMA may be confused for amyotrophic lateral sclerosis (ALS), cervical spondylotic amyotrophy (CSA), and other challenging neurological diseases, as well as conditions that are minor but that call for very different treatments, such as advanced carpal tunnel syndrome (CTS). Symptoms somewhat differ. Pain and tingling in the hand is typically present in CTS and absent from MMA; loss of function presents differently; with careful electrophysiological study and neurological exams the two are distinguished. In early stages, ALS, CSA, and MMA, presentation may be similar. Both CSA and ALS ultimately have more extensive symptoms. MMA is more prevalent in young people while ALS and CSA are more common in older populations. With ALS, hand symptoms usually more commonly both proximal and distal vs in MMA mostly distal only, and with ALS fasciculations (twitching) are often present in upper extremities, but rarely in MMA. MMA is usually eliminated from consideration if disability expresses itself in more than one extremity or in lower extremities (legs), but symptomatic absence may not rule out ALS for three to five years after initial onset. Electrophysiological texts and reflex tests tend to yield different results, but interpretation is at times subjective.

== Treatment ==
At present there is no cure for MMA. The impact on the affected individual ranges from minimal to significant depending on the extent of the weakness. Physical and occupational therapies include muscle strengthening exercises and training in hand coordination. Early use (i.e., while the onset of the disease is still in progress) of a cervical collar is increasingly encouraged as therapeutic for arresting further compression of the cervical spinal cord. Spinal surgery on patients with more advanced symptoms has met with reported success, but is still regarded as experimental.

== Prognosis ==
The symptoms of MMA usually progress slowly for two to five years and then remain stable for many years. The weakness can progress to the opposite limb, although whether this progression is typical or rare is under discussion. Cases of patient improvement and deterioration have both been described, but are atypical. Initially MMA can be confused for slowly progressing case of other neurological diseases such as amyotrophic lateral sclerosis (ALS); initial symptoms can be similar, but their causes are apparently different, and their outcomes markedly so. Diagnostic tools have improved since first described, and a few therapies are being introduced. But sometimes several years of observation are needed before a definitive diagnosis can be made.

Use of a cervical collar may afford relief, and some researchers advocate its therapeutic use. There is also a slowly progressive variant of MMA known as O'Sullivan-McLeod syndrome, which only affects the small muscles of the hand and forearm and has a slowly progressive course.

== Epidemiology ==
MMA is described most frequently in Asia, with studies of a few hundred individuals emerging from Japan, China and India; it is much less commonly seen in North America and Europe. The disease (disorder) was first described by Keizo Hirayama in 1959 as "juvenile muscular atrophy of unilateral upper extremity". In 1984 Mandavilli Gourie-Devi (et al.) introduced the term "monomelic amyotrophy". The disease primarily (but not exclusively) affects young (15- to 25-year-old) males. As of 2014 there had been less than 1500 described cases, starting with the patients in Hirayama's 1959 study. The condition is disproportionately high in Asia but no conclusive reason has been found for this. To date the largest studies recorded are Japan (333 cases), India (279 cases), and China (179 cases).

== Etymology ==
Both the names for the disorder and its possible causes have been evolving since first reported. Because this condition has been found almost exclusively in healthy young adults and stabilizes after a few years, a span of 23 years elapsed between the time Hirayama first described the condition, and the first death (from cancer), and autopsy. Over the several decades since first reported, a majority of researchers now describe this as a biomechanical condition linked to adolescent growth spurt. However, this is not yet a universal conclusion and there are anomalous reports that suggest an incomplete understanding of the condition.

== See also ==
- Lower motor neuron lesion
