= Distal hereditary motor neuronopathies =

Group of motor neuron diseases

Distal hereditary motor neuronopathies (distal HMNs, DHMNs, or dHMNs; sometimes also called distal hereditary motor neuropathies) are a genetically and clinically heterogeneous group of motor neuron diseases that result from genetic mutations in various genes and are characterized by degeneration and loss of motor neuron cells in the anterior horn of the spinal cord and subsequent muscle atrophy.

Although they can hardly be distinguished from hereditary motor and sensory neuropathies on the clinical level, dHMNs are considered a separate class of disorders.

Another common system of classification groups many of DHMNs under the heading of spinal muscular atrophies.

== Classification ==
In 1993, A. E. Hardnig proposed to classify hereditary motor neuropathies into seven groups based on age at onset, mode of inheritance, and presence of additional features. This initial classification has since been widely adopted and expanded and currently looks as follows:

Type	OMIM	Gene	Locus	Inheritance	Common names and characteristics
DHMN1	182960	?	7q34–q36	Autosomal dominant	Autosomal dominant juvenile distal spinal muscular atrophy Juvenile onset
DHMN2A	158590	HSPB8	12q24.23	Autosomal dominant	Autosomal dominant distal spinal muscular atrophy Adult onset. Allelic with Charcot–Marie–Tooth disease type 2F
DHMN2B	608634	HSPB1	7q11.23	Autosomal dominant	Adult onset
DHMN2C	613376	HSPB3	5q11.2	Autosomal dominant	
DHMN2D	615575	FBXO38	5q32	Autosomal dominant	Distal spinal muscular atrophy with calf predominance Juvenile or adult onset, slowly progressive, affects both proximal and distal muscles, initially manifests with calf weakness which progresses to hands
DHMN3; DHMN4	607088	?	11q13	Autosomal recessive	Distal spinal muscular atrophy type 3 DHMN3 – benign form: early adult onset, slowly progressive, no diaphragmatic paralysis DHMN4 – severe form: juvenile onset with diaphragmatic paralysis
DHMN5A	600794	GARS	7p14.3	Autosomal dominant	Distal spinal muscular atrophy type VA Upper limb predominance with spasticity of lower limbs Locus and phenotype overlapping with CMT-2D and SPG-17
DHMN5B	614751	REEP1	2p11.2	Autosomal dominant	Distal spinal muscular atrophy type VB Locus and phenotype overlapping with SPG-31
DHMN6	604320	IGHMBP2	11q13.3	Autosomal recessive	Distal spinal muscular atrophy type 1 (DSMA1); spinal muscular atrophy with respiratory distress type 1 (SMARD1) Infant onset, severe, with diaphragmatic failure
DHMN7A	158580	SLC5A7	2q12.3	Autosomal dominant	Spinal muscular atrophy with vocal cord paralysis; Harper–Young myopathy Infant onset with vocal cord paralysis
DHMN7B	607641	DCTN1	2p13.1	Autosomal dominant	Adult onset with vocal cord paralysis and facial weakness
DHMN8	600175	TRPV4	12q24.11	Autosomal dominant	Congenital distal spinal muscular atrophy Affects primarily distal muscles of lower limbs, non-progressive, rare
DHMNJ	605726	SIGMAR1	9p13.3	Autosomal recessive	Distal spinal muscular atrophy type 2; Jerash type spinal muscular atrophy Juvenile onset with pyramidal features

Note: Acronym HMN is also used interchangeably with DHMN.

== See also ==
- Motor neuron disease
- Hereditary motor and sensory neuropathies
- Spinal muscular atrophies
- Charcot–Marie–Tooth disease
- Hereditary spastic paraplegia
