= Spinal muscular atrophy with lower extremity predominance =

Spinal muscular atrophy with lower extremity predominance, sometimes called lower extremity-predominant spinal muscular atrophy, may refer to:

- Spinal muscular atrophy with lower extremity predominance 1
- Spinal muscular atrophy with lower extremity predominance 2A
- Spinal muscular atrophy with lower extremity predominance 2B

== See also ==
- Spinal muscular atrophies
