= Spinal muscular atrophies =

Muscular degenerative disorders caused by dysfunction of spinal neurons

- Location of neurons affected in spinal muscular atrophies
- Specialty: Neurology
- Symptoms: Loss of motor neurons resulting in muscle wasting

Spinal muscular atrophies (SMAs) are a genetically and clinically heterogeneous group of rare debilitating disorders characterised by the degeneration of lower motor neurons (neuronal cells situated in the anterior horn of the spinal cord) and subsequent atrophy (wasting) of various muscle groups in the body. While some SMAs lead to early infant death, other diseases of this group permit normal adult life with only mild weakness.

== Classification ==
Based on the type of muscles affected, spinal muscular atrophies can be divided into:

- Proximal spinal muscular atrophies, i.e., conditions that affect primarily proximal muscles;
- Distal spinal muscular atrophies (which significantly overlap with distal hereditary motor neuronopathies) where they affect primarily distal muscles.

When taking into account prevalence, spinal muscular atrophies are traditionally divided into:

- Autosomal recessive proximal spinal muscular atrophy, responsible for 90–95% of cases and usually called simply spinal muscular atrophy (SMA) – a disorder associated with a genetic mutation on the SMN1 gene on chromosome 5q (locus 5q13), diagnosed predominantly in young children and in its most severe form being the most common genetic cause of infant death if left untreated;
- Localised spinal muscular atrophies – much more rare conditions, in some instances described in but a few patients in the world, which are associated with mutations of genes other than SMN1 and for this reason sometimes termed simply non-5q spinal muscular atrophies; none has currently a causal treatment.

A more detailed classification is based on the gene associated with the condition (where identified) and is presented in table below.

Group	Name Alternative names	OMIM	Gene	Locus	Mode of inheritance	Characteristics
SMA	Spinal muscular atrophy (SMA): 5q spinal muscular atrophy; Autosomal recessive proximal spinal muscular atrophy; Werdnig–Hoffmann disease / Kugelberg–Welander disease	253300; 253550; 253400; 271150	SMN1	5q13.2	Autosomal recessive	Affects primarily proximal muscles in people of all ages, progressive, relatively common
XLSMA	X-linked spinal muscular atrophy type 1 (SMAX1): Spinal and bulbar muscular atrophy (SBMA); Kennedy's disease (KD)	313200	NR3C4	Xq12	X-linked recessive	Affects primarily bulbar muscles as well as sensory nerves mainly in adult men, progressive
XLSMA	X-linked spinal muscular atrophy type 2 (SMAX2): Arthrogryposis multiplex congenita – X-linked type 1 (AMCX1)	301830	UBA1	Xp11.23	X-linked recessive	Characterised by bone fractures, affects mainly distal muscles in newborn boys, usually fatal in infancy
XLSMA	X-linked spinal muscular atrophy type 3 (SMAX3): Distal spinal muscular atrophy – X-linked (DSMAX)	300489	ATP7A	Xq21.1	X-linked recessive	Affects distal muscles of all extremities mainly in boys, slowly progressive
DSMA	Distal spinal muscular atrophy type 1 (DSMA1): Spinal muscular atrophy with respiratory distress type 1 (SMARD1); Distal hereditary motor neuronopathy type 6 (DHMN6)	604320	IGHMBP2	11q13.3	Autosomal recessive	Affects mainly infant boys, similar to SMA type 1 but with diaphragmatic paralysis
DSMA	Distal spinal muscular atrophy type 2 (DSMA2): Distal hereditary motor neuronopathy – Jerash type (DHMN-J)	605726	SIGMAR1	19p13.3	Autosomal recessive	Slowly progressive
DSMA	Distal spinal muscular atrophy type 3 (DSMA3): Distal hereditary motor neuronopathy types 3 and 4 (DHMN3/DHMN4)	607088	?	11q13.3	Autosomal recessive	Slowly progressive
DSMA	Distal spinal muscular atrophy type 4 (DSMA4)	611067	PLEKHG5	1p36.31	Autosomal recessive	Slowly progressive, described only in one family
DSMA	Distal spinal muscular atrophy type 5 (DSMA5)	614881	DNAJB2	2q35	Autosomal recessive	Young adult onset, slowly progressive
DSMA	Distal spinal muscular atrophy type VA (DSMAVA): Distal hereditary motor neuronopathy type 5A (DHMN5A)	600794	GARS	7p14.3	Autosomal dominant	With upper limb predominance; allelic and overlapping with CMT2D, phenotype overlapping with Silver syndrome
DSMA	Distal spinal muscular atrophy type VB (DSMAVB): Distal hereditary motor neuronopathy type 5B (DHMN5B)	614751	REEP1	2p11	Autosomal dominant	With upper limb predominance; allelic and overlapping with HSP-31
DSMA	Distal spinal muscular atrophy with calf predominance: Distal hereditary motor neuronopathy type 2D (DHMN2D)	615575	FBXO38	5q32	Autosomal dominant	Juvenile- or adult-onset, slowly progressive, affects both proximal and distal muscles, initially manifests with calf weakness which progresses to hands
DSMA	Distal spinal muscular atrophy with vocal cord paralysis: Distal hereditary motor neuronopathy type 7A (DHMN7A); Harper–Young myopathy	158580	SLC5A7	2q12.3	Autosomal dominant	Adult-onset with vocal cord paralysis, very rare
DSMA	Congenital distal spinal muscular atrophy: Distal hereditary motor neuronopathy type 8 (DHMN8)	600175	TRPV4	12q24.11	Autosomal dominant	Affects primarily distal muscles of lower limbs, non-progressive, rare, allelic with SPSMA and CMT2C
DSMA	Scapuloperoneal spinal muscular atrophy (SPSMA): Scapuloperoneal neurogenic amyotrophy	181405	TRPV4	12q24.11	Autosomal dominant or X-linked dominant	Affects muscles of lower limbs, non-progressive, rare, allelic with congenital distal spinal muscular atrophy and CMT2C
DSMA	Autosomal dominant distal spinal muscular atrophy: Distal hereditary motor neuronopathy type 2A (DHMN2A)	158590	HSPB8	12q24.23	Autosomal dominant	Adult-onset. Allelic with Charcot–Marie–Tooth disease type 2L (CMT2L)
DSMA	Autosomal dominant juvenile distal spinal muscular atrophy: Distal hereditary motor neuronopathy type 1 (DHMN1)	182960	?	7q34–q36	Autosomal dominant	Juvenile-onset
	Juvenile segmental spinal muscular atrophy (JSSMA)	183020	?	18q21.3	?	Juvenile-onset, progressive with stabilisation after 2–4 years, affects primarily hands, very rare
	Finkel type proximal spinal muscular atrophy (SMAFK)	182980	VAPB	20q13.32	Autosomal dominant	Late-onset, affects proximal muscles in adults
	James type infantile spinal muscular atrophy (SMAJI)	619042	GARS1	7p14.3	Autosomal dominant	Infantile-onset hypotonia, slowly progressive, resulting in delayed motor milestones and loss of previous motor skills. Children never walk. Milder disorders caused by GARS1 mutations are CMT2D and HMN5A.
	Jokela type spinal muscular atrophy (SMAJ)	615048	CHCHD10	22q11.2–q13.2	Autosomal dominant	Late-onset, slowly progressive, affects both proximal and distal muscles in adults
	Spinal muscular atrophy with lower extremity predominance 1 (SMALED1)	158600	DYNC1H1	14q32	Autosomal dominant	Affects proximal muscles in infants
	Spinal muscular atrophy with lower extremity predominance 2A (SMALED2A)	615290	BICD2	9q22.31	Autosomal dominant	Early-onset, primarily affecting lower limbs, slowly progressive, non-life-limiting, very rare
	Spinal muscular atrophy with lower extremity predominance 2B (SMALED2B)	618291	BICD2	9q22.31	Autosomal dominant	Presents with hypotonia, contractures and respiratory involvement at birth, frequently fatal in early childhood, very rare
	Spinal muscular atrophy with progressive myoclonic epilepsy (SMAPME)	159950	ASAH1	8p22	Autosomal recessive	
	Spinal muscular atrophy with congenital bone fractures 1 (SMABF1)	616866	TRIP4	15q22.31	Autosomal recessive	Prenatal onset, characterised by severe muscle wasting, respiratory and feeding failure, and bone fractures at birth as in arthrogryposis multiplex congenita, usually fatal in infancy
	Spinal muscular atrophy with congenital bone fractures 2 (SMABF2)	616867	ASCC1	10q22.1	Autosomal recessive	Prenatal onset, characterised by severe muscle wasting, respiratory and feeding failure, and bone fractures at birth as in arthrogryposis multiplex congenita, usually fatal in infancy
PCH	Spinal muscular atrophy with pontocerebellar hypoplasia (SMA-PCH): Pontocerebellar hypoplasia type 1A (PCH1A)	607596	VRK1	14q32	Autosomal dominant	→ see Pontocerebellar hypoplasia
MMA	Juvenile asymmetric segmental spinal muscular atrophy (JASSMA): Monomelic amyotrophy; Hirayama disease; Sobue disease	602440	?	?	?	→ see Monomelic amyotrophy
PMA	Progressive spinal muscular atrophy: Progressive muscular atrophy; Duchenne-Aran muscular atrophy	?	?	?	?	→ see Progressive muscular atrophy

In all forms of SMA (with an exception of X-linked spinal muscular atrophy type 1), only motor neurons, located at the anterior horn of spinal cord, are affected; sensory neurons, which are located at the posterior horn of spinal cord, are not affected. By contrast, hereditary disorders that cause both weakness due to motor denervation along with sensory impairment due to sensory denervation are known as hereditary motor and sensory neuropathies (HMSN).

== See also ==
- Distal hereditary motor neuropathies
- Motor neuron disease
- Polyneuropathy in dogs and cats
