= DSMA =

DSMA may refer to:

- Congenital distal spinal muscular atrophy (congenital dSMA), a hereditary condition characterized by muscle wasting
- Defence and Security Media Advisory Notice (DSMA-Notice), a United Kingdom official request to news editors not to publish or broadcast items on specified subjects for reasons of national security
- Defence Services Medical Academy, the university of medicine of the Myanmar Armed Forces
- Detroit Sports Media Association, an organization that presents an annual award named in honor of Ernie Harwell
- Distal spinal muscular atrophy, one of several spinal muscular atrophies
- Disodium methyl arsenate, a less-toxic organic form of arsenic
- Dnepropetrovsk State Medical Academy, former name of Dnipro State Medical University, an establishment of higher education in Ukraine
- Downtown San Mateo Association, a non-profit organization in San Mateo, California

== See also ==
- DXMA, a radio station in the Philippines
