= Distal spinal muscular atrophy type 1 =

- Other names: Spinal muscular atrophy with respiratory distress type 1 (SMARD1), Distal hereditary motor neuronopathy type 6 (DHMN6) and Severe infantile axonal neuronopathy with respiratory failure
- Distal spinal muscular atrophy type 1 is inherited via an autosomal recessive manner.
- Specialty: Neurology
- Frequency: 0.0001%

Distal spinal muscular atrophy type 1 (DSMA1), also known as spinal muscular atrophy with respiratory distress type 1 (SMARD1), is a rare neuromuscular disorder involving death of motor neurons in the spinal cord which leads to a generalised progressive atrophy of body muscles.

The condition is caused by a genetic mutation in the IGHMBP2 gene and is inherited in an autosomal recessive manner. There is no known cure to DSMA1, and research of the disorder is still in early stages due to low incidence and high mortality rates.

== Signs and symptoms ==
Usually, the first respiratory symptoms are shortness of breath (dyspnea) and paradoxical respirations which then escalate within the first few months of life to diaphragmatic paralysis. The symptoms of diaphragmatic paralysis come on very rapidly and without warning, and the patient is often rushed to a hospital where they are placed on a ventilator for respiratory support. Due to the severe nature of diaphragmatic paralysis, the patient eventually needs continuous ventilation support to survive. Continuous ventilation, however, may in itself cause damage to the anatomy of the lungs.

In addition to diaphragmatic paralysis, other issues may arise: as the name suggests, the distal limbs are most affected with symptoms of weakness, restricting mobility due to (near-)paralysis of the distal limbs as well as the head and neck. Also, dysfunction of the peripheral nerves and the autonomic nervous system may occur. Due to these dysfunctions, the patients have been shown to suffer from excessive sweating and irregular heartbeat. The deep tendon reflex is also lost in patients with DSMA1.

Uterine growth retardation and poor foetal movement have been observed in severe DSMA1 cases.

== Causes ==
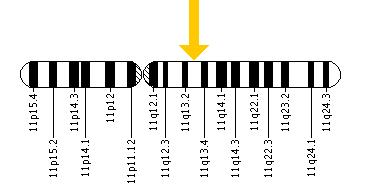
Location of the IGHMBP2 gene on chromosome 11, locus 11q13.3

DSMA1 is caused by a genetic mutation in the IGHMBP2 gene (located on chromosome 11, locus 11q13.3), which codes the immunoglobulin helicase μ-binding protein 2. The role of the IGHMBP2 protein is not fully understood, but it is known to affect mRNA processing. The cellular mechanisms of the mutation, as well as the protein mechanisms disrupted by the mutation, are unknown. IGHMBP2 mutations are usually random mutations which are normally not passed down through generations.

== Pathophysiology ==
The pathology underlying the observable characteristics of DSMA1 is cell body degeneration of motor nerves. Specifically, the anterior horn α-motorneurons degenerate within the first six months of life leading to a variety of symptoms. Muscle deterioration increases at around 1–2 years of age, resulting in reduced motor function. The most severely affected muscles include facial muscles and the tongue (which may develop a twitch due to hypoglossal nerve paralysis). Reduced pain sensation and excessive sweating are sometimes observed. Non-ambulant patients may develop pressure ulcers, severe constipation, urinary incontinence, and (rarely) reflux nephropathy in the advanced stages of the disease.

== Diagnosis ==
The diagnosis for DSMA1 is usually masked by a diagnosis for a respiratory disorder. In infants, DSMA1 is usually the cause of acute respiratory insufficiency in the first 6 months of life. The respiratory distress should be confirmed as diaphragmatic palsy by fluoroscopy or by electromyography. Although the patient may have a variety of other symptoms, the diaphragmatic palsy confirmed by fluoroscopy or other means is the main criteria for diagnosis. This is usually confirmed with genetic testing looking for mutations in the IGHMBP2 gene. The patient can be misdiagnosed if the respiratory distress is mistaken for a severe respiratory infection or DSMA1 can be mistaken for SMA type 1 because their symptoms are similar, even if they are separate disorders. To avoid misdiagnosis, genetic testing is necessary to confirm the diagnosis of DSMA1.

=== Classification ===
DSMA1 was identified and classified as a sub-group of spinal muscular atrophies (SMA) in 1974. Currently, various classifications include DSMA1 either among spinal muscular atrophies or among distal hereditary motor neuropathies, though the latter has been argued to be more correct.

== Treatment ==
There is no known cure to DSMA1, and care is primarily supportive. Patients require respiratory support which may include non-invasive ventilation or tracheotomy. The child may also undergo additional immunisations and offered antibiotics to prevent respiratory infections. Maintaining a healthy weight is also important. Patients are at risk of undernutrition and weight loss because of the increased energy spent for breathing. Physical and occupational therapy for the child can be very effective in maintaining muscle strength.

There is no published practice standard for the care in DSMA1, even though the Spinal Muscular Atrophy Standard of Care Committee has been trying to come to a consensus on the care standards for DSMA1 patients. The discrepancies in the practitioners' knowledge, family resources, and differences in patient's culture and/or residency have played a part in the outcome of the patient.

== Prognosis ==
DSMA1 is usually fatal in late infancy or early childhood. The child suffers a progressive degradation of the respiratory system until respiratory failure. There is no consensus on the life expectancy in DSMA1 despite a number of studies being conducted. A small number of patients survive past two years of age but they lack signs of diaphragmatic paralysis or their breathing is dependent on a ventilation system.

== Research directions ==
The disease has only been identified as distinct from SMA recently, so research is still experimental, taking place mostly in animal models. Several therapy pathways have been devised which include gene therapy, whereby an IGHMBP2 transgene is delivered to the cell using a viral vector, and small-molecule drugs like growth factors (e.g., IGF-1 and VEGF).

== See also ==
- Distal hereditary motor neuropathies
- Spinal muscular atrophies
- Spinal muscular atrophy
