= SMARD =

SMARD may refer to:

- Distal spinal muscular atrophy type 1, a rare neuromuscular disorder
- SMARD, a data portal provided by the German Federal Network Agency (BNetzA); see Open energy system databases § SMARD
