= Progressive muscular atrophy =

- Other names: Duchenne–Aran disease, Duchenne–Aran muscular atrophy
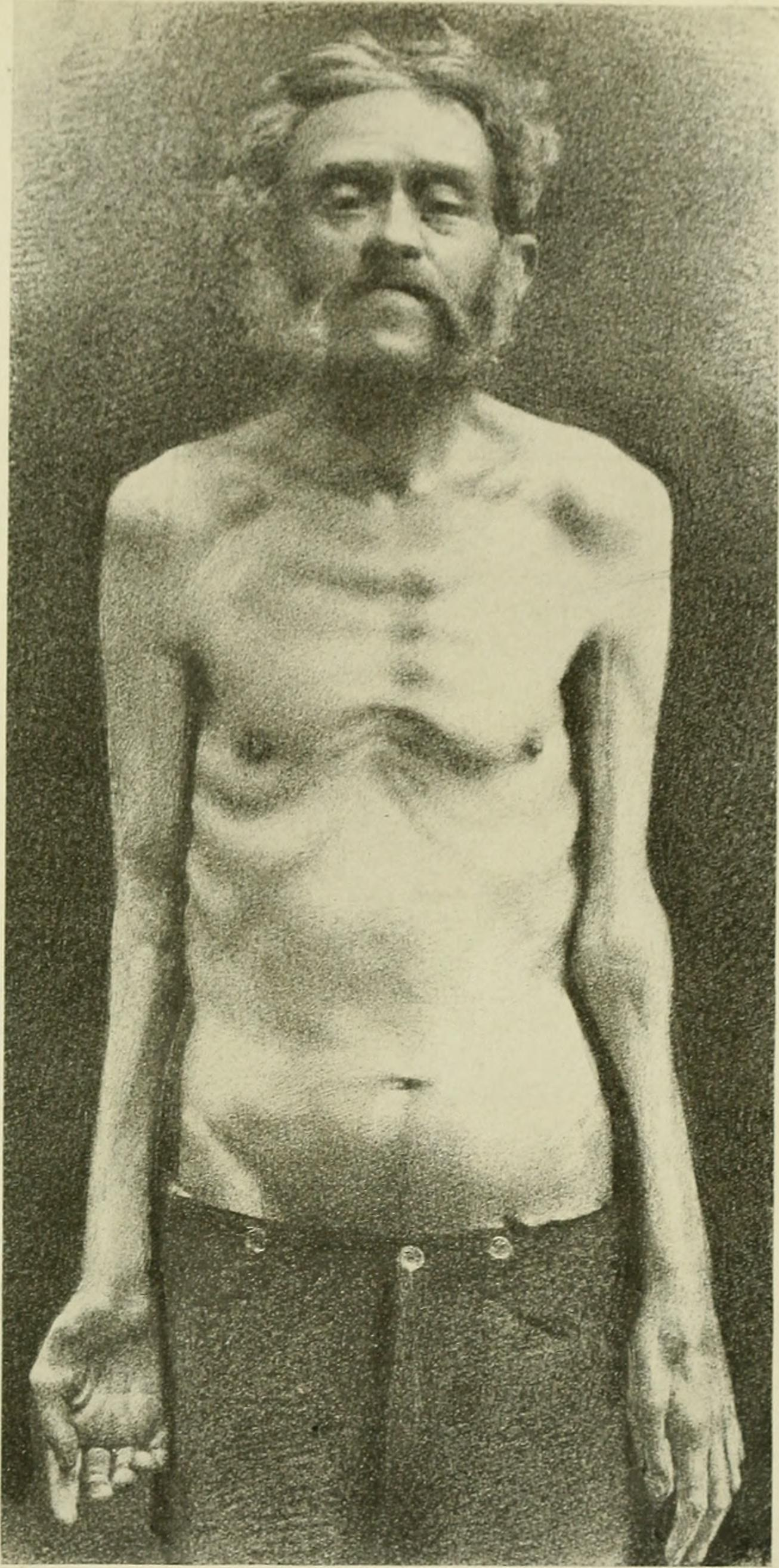
- Specialty: Neurology

Progressive muscular atrophy (PMA), also called Duchenne–Aran disease and Duchenne–Aran muscular atrophy, is a disorder characterized by the degeneration of lower motor neurons, resulting in generalized, progressive loss of muscle function.

PMA is classified among motor neuron diseases (MND) and it sporadically appears during adulthood. It is speculated that about 2.5%-11% of adult onset MND is PMA, making it less common than ALS.

PMA affects only the lower motor neurons, in contrast to amyotrophic lateral sclerosis (ALS), the most common MND, which affects both the upper and lower motor neurons, or primary lateral sclerosis, another MND, which affects only the upper motor neurons.

The history of PMA involved determining if it was a separate disease from ALS or if it was just the earlier stages of ALS. Eventually, scientists concluded that PMA was its own disease under the same category as ALS. The signs and symptoms of PMA are similar to ALS, but are located in a different region of the body. Additionally, the diagnosis can be more complex due to the nature of PMA and ALS. The prognosis of PMA can be longer than ALS because it affects less of the motor neurons. The options for treatment are small and are still being explored, from stem cell treatment to simple physical therapy. Although there is no cure, some treatments, such as physical therapy and certain medications, can slow its progression.

== History ==
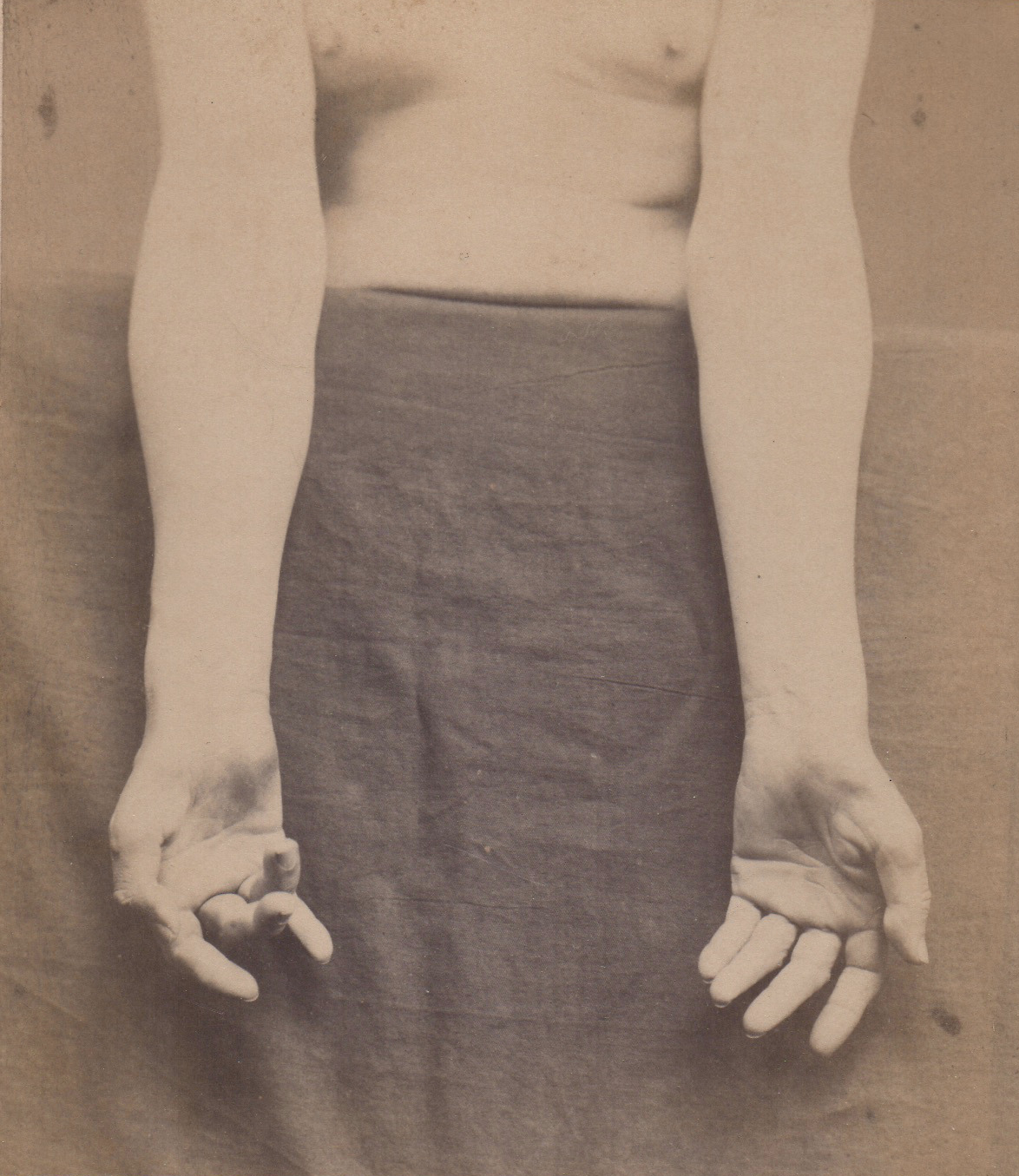
Clinical photograph showing two arms affected by muscular atrophy (Dejerine Foundation, Sorbonne University)

Despite being rarer than ALS, PMA was described earlier, when in 1850 French neurologist François Aran described 11 cases which he termed atrophie musculaire progressive. Contemporary neurologist Guillaume-Benjamin-Amand Duchenne de Boulogne English: /duːˈʃɛn/ also claimed to have described the condition 1 year earlier, although the written report was never found. The condition has been called progressive muscular atrophy (PMA), spinal muscular atrophy (SMA), Aran–Duchenne disease, Duchenne–Aran disease, Aran–Duchenne muscular atrophy, and Duchenne–Aran muscular atrophy. The name "spinal muscular atrophy" is ambiguous as it refers to any of various spinal muscular atrophies, including the autosomal recessive spinal muscular atrophy caused by a genetic defect in the SMN1 gene.

=== Disease or syndrome ===
Since its initial description in 1850, there has been debate in the scientific literature over whether PMA is a distinct disease with its own characteristics, or if lies somewhere on a spectrum with ALS, PLS, and PBP. Jean-Martin Charcot, who first described ALS in 1870, felt that PMA was a separate condition, with degeneration of the lower motor neurons the most important lesion, whereas in ALS it was the upper motor neuron degeneration that was primary, with lower motor neuron degeneration being secondary. Such views still exist in archaic terms for PMA such as "Primary progressive spinal muscular atrophy". Throughout the course of the late 19th century, other conditions were discovered which had previously been thought to be PMA, such as pseudo-hypertrophic paralysis, hereditary muscular atrophy, progressive myopathy, progressive muscular dystrophy, peripheral neuritis, and syringomyelia.

The neurologists Joseph Jules Dejerine and William Richard Gowers were among those who felt that PMA was part of a spectrum of motor neuron disease which included ALS, PMA, and PBP, in part because it was almost impossible to distinguish the conditions at autopsy. Other researchers have suggested that PMA is just ALS in an earlier stage of progression, because although the upper motor neurons appear unaffected on clinical examination there are in fact detectable pathological signs of upper motor neuron damage on autopsy.

== Signs and symptoms ==
As a result of lower motor neuron degeneration, the symptoms of PMA include:

- muscle weakness
- muscle atrophy
- fasciculations
- lack of tendon reflexes

Some patients have symptoms restricted only to the arms or legs (or in some cases just one of either). These cases are referred to as flail limb (either flail arm or flail leg) and are associated with a better prognosis.

== Diagnosis and prognosis ==
PMA is a diagnosis of exclusion, there is no specific test which can conclusively establish whether a patient has the condition. Instead, a number of other possibilities have to be ruled out, such as multifocal motor neuropathy or spinal muscular atrophy. Tests used in the diagnostic process include MRI, clinical examination, and EMG. EMG tests in patients who do have PMA usually show denervation (neuron death) in most affected body parts, and in some unaffected parts too.

Neurofilaments have also been studied as a way to diagnose PMA and other motor neurons diseases. Neurofilaments are a type of filament that helps neurons convey proteins. They help diagnose PMA and differentiate it from other motor neuron diseases by measuring the amount of neurofilaments and what type it is. This method is typically used with other tests and signs, as diagnosing PMA can sometimes be difficult. Electromyograms (EMG) and blood tests are the main method of testing for PMA because EMGs can aid in nerve activity and blood tests can rule out other diseases.

Sometimes PMA can seem to progress to ALS, meaning it was misdiagnosed. When PMA develops symptoms that are related to the upper neurons diseases, the patient will go through more testing and be diagnosed to ALS.

=== Differential diagnosis ===
In contrast to amyotrophic lateral sclerosis or primary lateral sclerosis, PMA is distinguished by the absence of:

- brisk reflexes
- spasticity
- Babinski's sign
- Increase in jaw jerking
- Lower cognitive activity

The importance of correctly recognizing progressive muscular atrophy as opposed to ALS is important for several reasons.

- The prognosis is a little better. A recent study found the 5-year survival rate in PMA to be 33% (vs 20% in ALS) and the 10-year survival rate to be 12% (vs 6% in ALS).
- Patients with PMA do not have the cognitive change identified in certain groups of patients with MND.
- Because PMA patients do not have UMN signs, they usually do not meet the World Federation of Neurology El Escorial Research Criteria for "Definite" or "Probable" ALS and so are ineligible to participate in the majority of clinical trials conducted in ALS.
- Because of its rarity (even compared to ALS) and confusion about the condition, some insurance policies or local healthcare policies may not recognize PMA as being the life-changing illness that it is. In cases where being classified as being PMA rather than ALS is likely to restrict access to services, it may be preferable to be diagnosed as "slowly progressive ALS" or "lower motor neuron predominant" ALS.

An initial diagnosis of PMA could turn out to be slowly progressive ALS many years later, sometimes even decades after the initial diagnosis. The occurrence of upper motor neuron symptoms such as brisk reflexes, spasticity, or a Babinski sign would indicate a progression to ALS; the correct diagnosis is also occasionally made on autopsy.

=== Prognosis ===
Individuals who are diagnosed with PMA typically have a longer survival rate than ALS. About 56% of patients who were diagnosed with PMA lived for another 5 years or more, while with ALS only 14% of patients live for another 5 years. The reason why PMA typically has a longer prognosis than ALS is because PMA only affects the lower motor neuron while ALS affects both the upper and lower motor neurons.

== Treatment ==
The treatment for any motor neuron disease can be complex due to how the disease works. Motor neuron diseases involve the damage or degeneration of neurons, which do not heal or regenerate as quickly as other cells. Currently, there is no cure for motor neuron diseases, which includes progressive muscular atrophy, but there are some treatments that can slow the progression of the disease.

The main treatment for PMA is physical therapy, which helps by maintaining the strength and flexibility of the lower body muscles affected by the disease. By using the muscles that are affected, the disease progression can possibly slow down and encourage independence.

=== Stem cells ===
Stem cells are special kind of cell that are able to self replicate and differentiate, which means that they are able to make other stem cells and branch into other kinds of cells. The discovery of stem cells has helped developed new theories, opening the concept of using stem cells to treat difficult diseases. Current research has shown that stem cells can possibly be used in motor neuron diseases by protecting neurons from degeneration, but it cannot regenerate neurons that have already been damaged. Stem cell treatment is still being researched and no neural stem cell treatment has been approved by the FDA.

== Notable cases ==
- Isaac W. Sprague - Entertainer and sideshow performer, billed as "the living human skeleton".
- Mike Gregory - Former Great Britain rugby league captain and head coach at Wigan RLFC
- Rob Rensenbrink - Former Netherlands and Anderlecht football player
