= Distal hereditary motor neuropathy type V =

- Other names: dHMN V

Distal hereditary motor neuropathy type V is a particular type of neuropathic disorder. In general, distal hereditary motor neuropathies affect the axons of distal motor neurons and are characterized by progressive weakness and atrophy of muscles of the extremities. It is common for them to be called "spinal forms of Charcot-Marie-Tooth disease (CMT)", because the diseases are closely related in symptoms and genetic cause. The diagnostic difference in these diseases is the presence of sensory loss in the extremities. There are seven classifications of dHMNs, each defined by patterns of inheritance, age of onset, severity, and muscle groups involved. Type V (sometimes notated as Type 5) is a disorder characterized by autosomal dominance, weakness of the upper limbs that is progressive and symmetrical, and atrophy of the small muscles of the hands.

== Signs and symptoms ==
Onset usually occurs within the first two decades of life, commonly in the teenage years or the twenties. Life expectancy is normal.

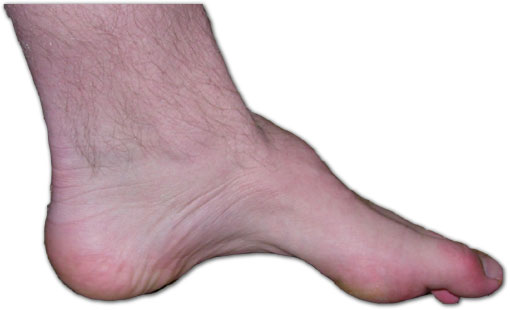
High arch of the foot (pes cavus) seen in dHMN V and other related motor neuropathy disorders

High arch of the foot (pes cavus) is common. Patients also have trouble controlling their hands, due to muscle loss on the thumb side of the index finger and palm below the thumb. It is rare for a person with this disorder to lose the ability to walk, though changes in gait may occur later in life.

Frequency of this disorder is unknown.

== Genetics ==
dHMN V has a pattern of autosomal dominance, meaning that only one copy of the gene is needed for the development of the disease. However, there is incomplete penetrance of this disorder, meaning that some individuals with the disease-causing mutations will not display any symptoms. Mutations on chromosome 7 have been linked to this disease. It is allelic (i.e., caused by mutations on the same gene) with Charcot–Marie–Tooth disease and with Silver’s Syndrome, a disorder also characterized by small muscle atrophy in the hands. Another rare form of dHMN V is associated with a splicing mutation in REEP-1, a gene often associated with hereditary spastic paraplegia.

== Diagnosis ==
In an individual with dHMN V, electromyography will show pure motor neuropathy, patterns of weakness without upper motor neuron damage, in the hands. Tendon reflexes will also appear normal. Clinical, electrophysiological, and pathological testing will show a lack of damage to sensory neurons, differentiating this disease from CMT.

== Treatment ==
Physical therapy is the predominant treatment of symptoms. Orthopedic shoes and foot surgery can be used to manage foot problems.
