= Hereditary motor and sensory neuropathy with proximal dominance =

- Other names: Hereditary motor and sensory neuropathy, Okinawa type
- This condition is inherited in an autosomal dominant manner
- Specialty: Neurology

Hereditary motor and sensory neuropathy with proximal dominance (HMSN-P) is an autosomal dominant neurodegenerative disorder that is defined by extensive involuntary and spontaneous muscle contractions, asthenia, and atrophy with distal sensory involvement following. The disease starts presenting typically in the 40s and is succeeded by a slow and continuous onslaught. Muscle spasms and muscle contractions large in number are noted, especially in the earliest stages. The presentation of HMSN-P is quite similar to amyotrophic lateral sclerosis and has common neuropathological findings. Sensory loss happens as the disease progresses, but the amount of sensation lost varies from case to case. There have been other symptoms of HMSN-P reported such as urinary disturbances and a dry cough.

Two large families in Japan have been identified with the disease locus to chromosome 3q. From descendants of Japan, HMSN-P was brought to Brazil, from there it is a pretty isolated disease. Through clinical studies, researchers identified that TFG mutations on chromosome 3q13.2 causes HMSN-P. "The presence of TFG/ubiquitin- and/or TDP-43-immunopositive cytoplasmic inclusions in motor neurons and cytosolic aggregation composed of TDP-43 in cultured cells expressing mutant TFG indicate a novel pathway of motor neuron death"

== See also ==
- Hereditary motor and sensory neuropathy
