= CHCHD10 =

Protein-coding gene in humans

Identifiers
- Aliases: CHCHD10, C22orf16, FTDALS2, N27C7-4, IMMD, SMAJ, coiled-coil-helix-coiled-coil-helix domain containing 10, MIX17A
- External IDs: OMIM: 615903; MGI: 2143558; GeneCards: CHCHD10
Available structures
PDB	Ortholog search: PDBe RCSB
PDB	List of PDB id codes 3J9M

Gene location (Human)
Chr.	Chromosome 22 (human)
Band	22q11.23	Start	23,765,834 bp
Band	22q11.23	End	23,767,972 bp

Gene location (Mouse)
Chr.	Chromosome 10 (mouse)
Band	10|10 C1	Start	75,768,964 bp
Band	10|10 C1	End	75,773,581 bp
RNA expression pattern
Bgee	Human / Mouse (ortholog); Top expressed in: apex of heart; left ventricle; muscle of thigh; right auricle of heart; gastrocnemius muscle; skeletal muscle tissue; mucosa of transverse colon; primary visual cortex; right lobe of liver; human kidney / Top expressed in: choroid plexus of fourth ventricle; digastric muscle; Epithelium of choroid plexus; myocardium of ventricle; intercostal muscle; left lobe of liver; right ventricle; sternocleidomastoid muscle; interventricular septum; triceps brachii muscle; More reference expression data
BioGPS	n/a
Gene ontology
Molecular function	molecular function; protein binding
Cellular component	mitochondrial intermembrane space; mitochondrion; nucleus
Biological process	ATP biosynthetic process; mitochondrion organization; oxidative phosphorylation; negative regulation of ATP citrate synthase activity
Sources:Amigo / QuickGO
Orthologs
Databases	NCBI: entry; OMA: entry
Species	Human	Mouse
Entrez	400916	103172
Ensembl	ENSG00000273607; ENSG00000250479	ENSMUSG00000049422
UniProt	Q8WYQ3	Q7TNL9
RefSeq (mRNA)	NM_001301339; NM_213720	NM_175329
RefSeq (protein)	NP_001288268; NP_998885	NP_780538
Location (UCSC)	Chr 22: 23.77 – 23.77 Mb	Chr 10: 75.77 – 75.77 Mb
PubMed search
- Wikidata
View/Edit Human	View/Edit Mouse

Coiled-coil-helix-coiled-coil-helix domain-containing protein 10, mitochondrial, also known as Protein N27C7-4, is a protein that in humans is encoded by the CHCHD10 gene.

== Structure ==
The CHCHD10 gene is located on the q arm of chromosome 22 at position 11.23 and it spans 2,138 base pairs. The CHCHD10 gene produces a 14.9 kDa protein composed of 149 amino acids. It is enriched at cristae junctions in the intermembrane space of the mitochondria. The structure of the protein contains a nonstructured N-terminal region, a hydrophobic helix and a C-terminal CHCH domain which contains a Cx(9)C motif and two additional cysteines. A total of four cysteines are predicted to form two disulfide bonds.

== Function ==
This gene encodes for a mitochondrial protein that is enriched at cristae junctions in the intermembrane space. It may play a role in cristae morphology maintenance or oxidative phosphorylation.

== Clinical significance ==
CHCHD10-related disorders include Myopathy, isolated mitochondrial, autosomal dominant (IMMD),

=== FTDALS1 ===
Frontotemporal dementia and/or amyotrophic lateral sclerosis 1 (FTDALS1), Spinal muscular atrophy, Jokela type (SMAJ).

=== FTDALS2 ===
Frontotemporal dementia and/or amyotrophic lateral sclerosis 2 (FTDALS2) is a neurodegenerative disorder with high intrafamilial variation with phenotypes such as frontotemporal dementia and/or amyotrophic lateral sclerosis. Frontotemporal dementia is characterized by frontal and temporal lobe atrophy associated with neuronal loss, gliosis, and dementia. Patients exhibit progressive changes in social, behavioral, and/or language function. Amyotrophic lateral sclerosis is characterized by the death of motor neurons in the brain, brainstem, and spinal cord, resulting in fatal paralysis.

=== SMAJ ===
Spinal muscular atrophy, Jokela type (SMAJ) is an autosomal dominant, slowly progressive, lower motor neuron disease. SMAJ is characterized by adult-onset of muscle cramps and fasciculations affecting the proximal and distal muscles of the upper and lower limbs. The disorder results in weakness and mild muscle atrophy later in life.

=== IMMD ===
Myopathy, isolated mitochondrial, autosomal dominant (IMMD) is a mitochondrial myopathy presenting with severe exercise intolerance, progressive proximal weakness, and lactic acidemia. The disorder is slowly progressive, with later involvement of facial muscles, muscles of the upper limbs, and distal muscles.

=== Others ===
Mutations in CHCHD10 has also been found to be associated with cerebellar ataxia, frontotemporal dementia (FTD), and other mitochondrial diseases.

== Interactions ==
CHCHD10 has been known to interact with C1QBP, CLPX, FAF1, RNASEH1, ZNF444, KLF13, and other proteins.
