= TMEM63A =

Protein-coding gene in humans

Identifiers
- Aliases: TMEM63A, KIAA0792, transmembrane protein 63A, HLD19
- External IDs: MGI: 2384789; GeneCards: TMEM63A

Gene location (Human)
Chr.	Chromosome 1 (human)
Band	1q42.12	Start	225,845,536 bp
Band	1q42.12	End	225,882,380 bp

Gene location (Mouse)
Chr.	Chromosome 1 (mouse)
Band	1|1 H4	Start	180,769,909 bp
Band	1|1 H4	End	180,802,677 bp
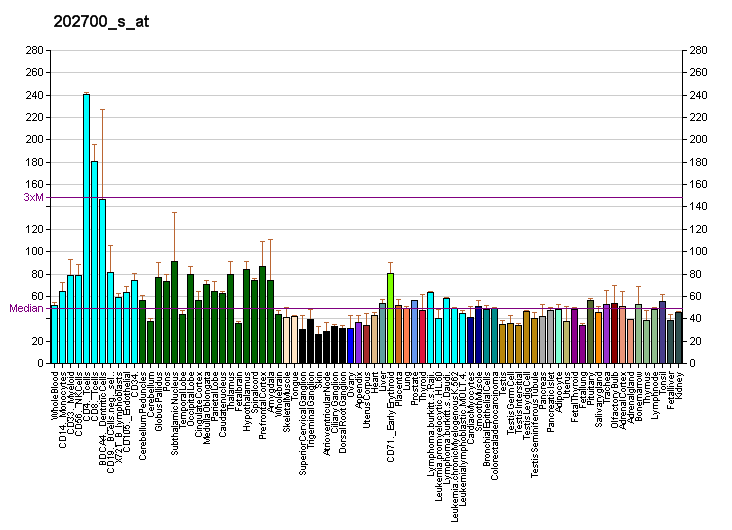

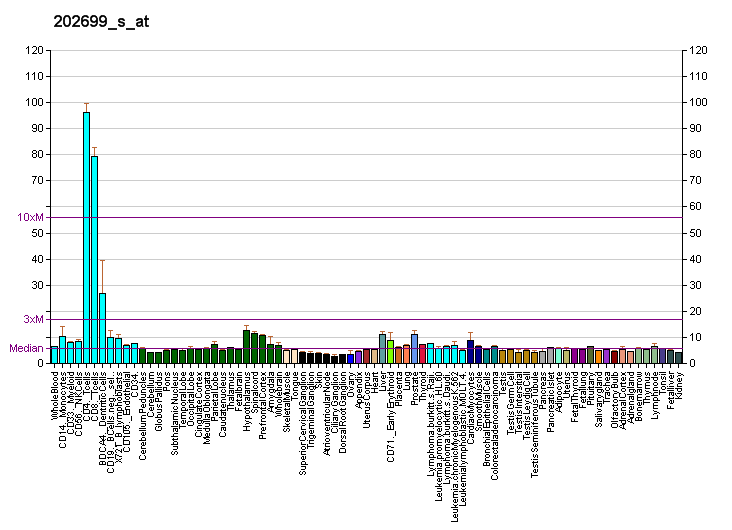
RNA expression pattern
Bgee	Human / Mouse (ortholog); Top expressed in: C1 segment; right uterine tube; middle frontal gyrus; body of pancreas; minor salivary glands; corpus callosum; buccal mucosa cell; granulocyte; rectum; canal of the cervix / Top expressed in: ascending aorta; pyloric antrum; aortic valve; gastric mucosa; mucous cell of stomach; epithelium of stomach; lip; granulocyte; submandibular gland; lumbar subsegment of spinal cord; More reference expression data
BioGPS	More reference expression data
Gene ontology
Molecular function	nucleic acid binding; calcium activated cation channel activity
Cellular component	integral component of membrane; lysosomal membrane; lysosome; extracellular exosome; membrane; microtubule organizing center; plasma membrane; specific granule membrane; intracellular membrane-bounded organelle; tertiary granule membrane
Biological process	ion transport; neutrophil degranulation; transport; ion transmembrane transport
Sources:Amigo / QuickGO
Orthologs
Databases	NCBI: entry; OMA: entry
Species	Human	Mouse
Entrez	9725	208795
Ensembl	ENSG00000196187	ENSMUSG00000026519
UniProt	O94886	Q91YT8
RefSeq (mRNA)	NM_014698	NM_144794
RefSeq (protein)	NP_055513	NP_659043
Location (UCSC)	Chr 1: 225.85 – 225.88 Mb	Chr 1: 180.77 – 180.8 Mb
PubMed search
- Wikidata
View/Edit Human	View/Edit Mouse

Transmembrane protein 63A is a protein that in humans is encoded by the TMEM63A gene. The mature human protein is approximately 92.1 kilodaltons (kDa), with a relatively high conservation of mass in orthologs. The protein contains eleven transmembrane domains and is inserted into the membrane of the lysosome. BioGPS analysis for TMEM63A in humans shows that the gene is ubiquitously expressed, with the highest levels of expression found in T-cells and dendritic cells.

== Gene ==
=== Overview ===
TMEM63A is located on the negative DNA strand of chromosome 1 at location 1q42.12, spanning base pairs 226,033,237 to 226,070,069. Aliases include KIAA0489 and KIAA0792. The human gene product is a 4,469 base pair mRNA with 25 predicted exons. There are 9 predicted splice isoforms of the gene, three of which are protein coding. Promoter analysis was carried out using El Dorado through the Genomatix software page. The predicted promoter region spans 971 base pairs, from 226,070,920 to 226,069,950 on the negative strand of chromosome 1.

=== Gene neighborhood ===
TMEM63A is located adjacent to the EPHX1 gene on the positive sense strand of DNA on chromosome 1, as well as the LEFTY1 gene on the negative sense strand. Other genes in the same area on chromosome 1 include SRP9 and LEFTY3 on the positive strand, and MIR6741 and PYCR2 on the negative strand.

=== Expression ===
TMEM63 is ubiquitously expressed throughout the human body at varying levels, occurring with the highest relative prevalence in CD 8+ T cells and CD 4+ T cells. Moderate relative levels of expression are also observed throughout the brain, particularly in the occipital lobe, parietal lobe, and pancreas. Analysis of TMEM63A expression in the mouse using BioGPS revealed more variable expression patterns, with the highest expression being seen in the stomach and large intestine. Using the El Dorado program from Genomatix, transcription factor regulation was predicted, which found that TMEM63A is highly regulated by E2F cell cycle regulators and EGR1, a factor believed to be a tumor suppressor gene with expression in the brain. The 3' UTR is predicted to be bound by the regulatory element miR-9/9ab.

== Protein ==
=== Properties and characteristics ===
The mature form of the human TMEM63A protein has 807 amino acid residues with an isoelectric point of 6.925. This is fairly conserved across orthologs. A BLAST alignment revealed that the protein contains three domains: RSN1_TM and two domains of unknown function (DUF4463 and DUF221). RSN1_TM is predicted to be involved in Golgi vesicle transport and exocytosis. DUF4463 is cytosolic and distantly homologous to RNA-binding proteins. This domain can be used to determine the orientation of the protein in the membrane, with the N-terminus of the protein being within the lysosome and the C-terminus located in the cytosol.

Post-translational modification has been determined both experimentally and using bioinformatic analysis. There are two likely sites of glycosylation on the protein: N38 and N450. These were predicted using the NetNGlyc program from ExPASy and the TMEM63A amino acid sequence, as well as the inferred orientation of the protein in the membrane. There are three likely sites of phosphorylation on the protein: S85, S98, and S735, which were predicted using the NetPhos program.

The protein has three isoforms. The mature protein is designated isoform CRA. The other two isoforms are X1 and X2, which are 630 amino acid residues and 468 amino acid residues long, respectively. Isoform X1 is missing the N-terminus of the mature protein, while isoform 2 is missing the C-terminus.

=== Interactions ===
Using text-based information, TMEM63A is thought to potentially interact with six other proteins: EEF1D, FAM163B, CPNE9, TMEM90A, STAC2, HEATR3, and WDR67.

=== Function ===
The function of TMEM63A is not known, although one study found it was in a region likely regulated by mir-200a, linked to epithelial homeostasis. Another found it to be in a quantitative trait locus linked to haloperidol-induced catalepsy.

== Evolutionary history ==
=== Paralogs ===
TMEM63A has two paralogs: TMEM63B, which is located at 6p21.1, and TMEM63C, which is located at C14orf171. Alignment between them shows that TMEM63C is more closely related to TMEM63B than TMEM63A. A BLAST alignment showed homology of TMEM63A and TMEM63B to proteins as distantly related as plants, while TMEM63C was homologous only as distantly as in Drosophila. This indicates that TMEM63C likely diverged from the two early in invertebrates.

=== Ortholog space ===
TMEM63A has a large ortholog space, with homologs present in organisms as distantly related as plants.

Genus and species	Common name	Class	Accession	Percent identity
Otolemur garnettii	Bush baby	Mammalia	XP_003791028.1	91%
Vicugna pacos	Alpaca	Mammalia	XP_006198896.1	92%
Mus musculus	Mouse	Mammalia	NP_659043.1	90%
Trichechus manatus latirostris	West Indian manatee	Mammalia	XP_004375949.1	89%
Canis lupus familiaris	Dog	Mammalia	NP_001274088.1	89%
Myotis davidii	Mouse-eared bat	Mammalia	XP_006761379.1	80%
Pelodiscus sinensis	Chinese softshell turtle	Sauropsida	XP_006118107.1	71%
Alligator sinensis	Chinese alligator	Reptilia	XP_006016630.1	70%
Ficedula albicollis	Collared flycatcher	Aves	XP_005043078.1	69%
Gallus gallus	Red junglefowl	Aves	XP_419384.3	68%
Xenopus tropicalis	Western clawed frog	Amphibia	NP_001072343.1	65%
Ictalurus punctatus	Channel catfish	Actinopterygii	AHH42519.1	54%
Culex quinquefasciatus	Southern house mosquito	Insecta	XP_001861445.1	34%
Clonorchis sinensis	Chinese liver fluke	Trematoda	GAA53916.1	23%
Oryza sativa	Asian rice	Liliopsida	NP_001065504.1	20%
