= Jokela type spinal muscular atrophy =

- Other names: Late-onset spinal motor neuronopathy, LOSMoN; Spinal muscular atrophy, Jokela type (SMAJ)
- The disease is common in North Karelia

Jokela type spinal muscular atrophy (SMAJ), also known as late-onset spinal motor neuronopathy (LOSMoN), is an ultra-rare neuromuscular disorder characterized by muscle twitches and cramps. The symptoms appear in adulthood and gradually progress. The disease is caused by a mutation in the CHCHD10 gene and is inherited in an autosomal dominant pattern. It was first described by the Finnish neurologist Manu Jokela in 2011.

== Symptoms and signs ==
The first symptoms include muscle cramps and muscle twitches affecting the upper and lower limbs. They appear usually after age of 40. The disease is slowly progressive with adult onset and results in weakness and mild muscle atrophy. The disease does not affect life expectancy. However, it is difficult to differentiate the disease from a more fatal amyotrophic lateral sclerosis in diagnosis.

Ultimately, SMAJ can lead to reduced ability in motor function for skills such as walking. SMAJ may also reduce one's nerve function and ability to sense vibrations.

== Epidemiology ==
As of 2016 it has been found only in a handful of families living in the Karelia region of Finland.

== History ==
The disease was first described by the Finnish neurologist Manu Jokela in 2011 who has also identified the gene responsible for the disease.

== See also ==
- Chromosome 22
- Finnish heritage disease
- Spinal muscular atrophies
