= Flail limb =

Medical condition

A flail limb (also flail arm or flail leg) is a medical term which refers to an extremity in which the primary nerve has been severed or ceased to function, resulting in complete lack of mobility and sensation. Although blood typically continues to flow through the limb, it is completely useless and potential for surgical repair is limited. The muscles soon wither away from atrophy, and the limb swings loosely at the side like a "dead weight."

Flail limb can occur in cases of traumatic injury to the brachial plexus or in people with motor neuron diseases such as amyotrophic lateral sclerosis.

Amputation of the affected limb and replacement with a prosthesis is one option for treatment. Amputation does not reduce pain experienced.

== See also ==
- Progressive muscular atrophy
- Brachial amyotrophic diplegia
