= EEF1D =

Protein-coding gene in the species Homo sapiens

Available structures
PDB	Ortholog search: PDBe RCSB
PDB	List of PDB id codes 2MVM, 2MVN, 2N51

Identifiers
- Aliases: EEF1D, EF-1D, EF1D, FP1047, eukaryotic translation elongation factor 1 delta
- External IDs: OMIM: 130592; MGI: 1913906; HomoloGene: 23404; GeneCards: EEF1D; OMA:EEF1D - orthologs

Gene location (Human)
Chr.	Chromosome 8 (human)
Band	8q24.3	Start	143,579,697 bp
Band	8q24.3	End	143,599,541 bp

Gene location (Mouse)
Chr.	Chromosome 15 (mouse)
Band	15|15 D3	Start	75,766,054 bp
Band	15|15 D3	End	75,781,405 bp
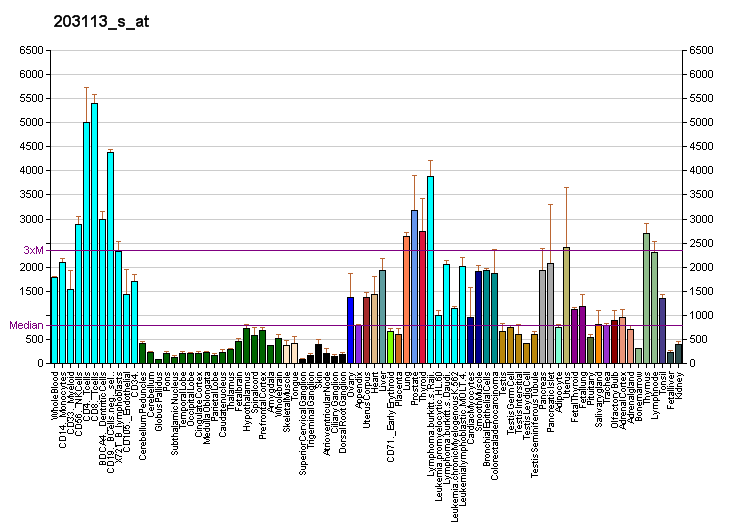

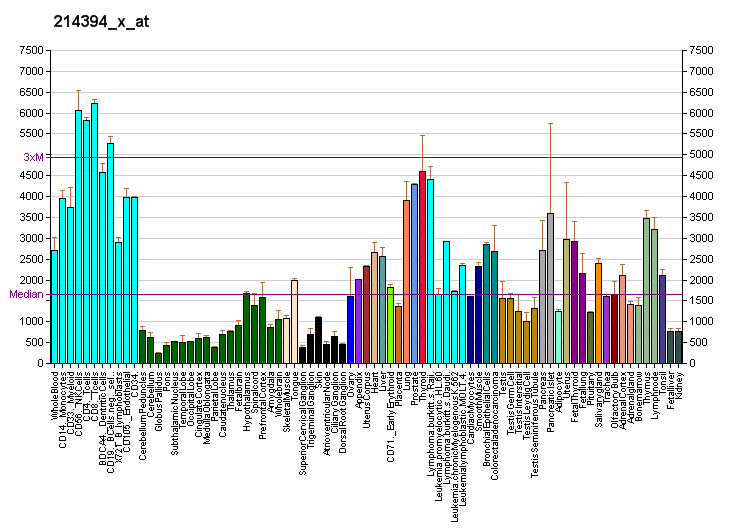
RNA expression pattern
Bgee	Human / Mouse (ortholog); Top expressed in: Achilles tendon; apex of heart; left ovary; right ovary; body of pancreas; right lobe of thyroid gland; prostate; muscle layer of sigmoid colon; body of uterus; canal of the cervix / Top expressed in: primitive streak; condyle; fossa; internal carotid artery; somite; endothelial cell of lymphatic vessel; aortic valve; ascending aorta; external carotid artery; hair follicle; More reference expression data
BioGPS	More reference expression data
Gene ontology
Molecular function	DNA binding; heat shock protein binding; translation factor activity, RNA binding; signal transducer activity; translation elongation factor activity; protein binding; cadherin binding
Cellular component	cytoplasm; endoplasmic reticulum; nucleus; eukaryotic translation elongation factor 1 complex; fibrillar center; cytosol
Biological process	regulation of transcription, DNA-templated; regulation of cell death; translational elongation; mRNA transcription; transcription, DNA-templated; cellular response to ionizing radiation; positive regulation of I-kappaB kinase/NF-kappaB signaling; signal transduction; protein biosynthesis
Sources:Amigo / QuickGO
Orthologs
Species	Human	Mouse
Entrez	1936	66656
Ensembl	ENSG00000104529; ENSG00000273594	ENSMUSG00000055762
UniProt	P29692	P57776
RefSeq (mRNA)	NM_001130053; NM_001130054; NM_001130055; NM_001130056; NM_001130057 NM_001195203; NM_001289950; NM_001960; NM_032378; NM_001317743; NM_001330646	NM_001285429; NM_001285430; NM_001285431; NM_001285432; NM_001285433 NM_001285434; NM_023240; NM_029663
RefSeq (protein)	NP_001123525; NP_001123527; NP_001123528; NP_001123529; NP_001182132 NP_001276879; NP_001304672; NP_001317575; NP_001951; NP_115754	NP_001272358; NP_001272359; NP_001272360; NP_001272361; NP_001272362 NP_001272363; NP_075729; NP_083939
Location (UCSC)	Chr 8: 143.58 – 143.6 Mb	Chr 15: 75.77 – 75.78 Mb
PubMed search
- Wikidata
View/Edit Human	View/Edit Mouse

Elongation factor 1-delta is a protein that in humans is encoded by the EEF1D gene.

== Function ==
This gene encodes a subunit of the elongation factor-1 complex, which is responsible for the enzymatic delivery of aminoacyl tRNAs to the ribosome. This subunit functions as guanine nucleotide exchange factor. It is reported that this subunit interacts with HIV-1 Tat, and thus it represses the translation of host-cell, but not HIV-1, mRNAs. Several alternatively spliced transcript variants have been found for this gene, however, the full length nature of only two variants has been determined.

== Interactions ==
EEF1D has been shown to interact with Glycyl-tRNA synthetase, EEF1G and KTN1, and is predicted to interact with TMEM63A.
