= Spinal muscular atrophy with lower extremity predominance 1 =

Neuromuscular disorder

- Other names: Lower extremity predominant spinal muscular atrophy type 1, SMALED1
- Spinal muscular atrophy with lower extremity predominance is inherited in an autosomal dominant manner.
- Specialty: Neurology
- Symptoms: Progressive muscle atrophy in legs
- Usual onset: Infancy
- Causes: Mutation in DYNC1H1 gene
- Diagnostic method: Molecular test

Spinal muscular atrophy with lower extremity predominance 1 (SMALED1) is an extremely rare neuromuscular disorder of infants characterised by severe progressive muscle atrophy which is especially prominent in legs.

The disorder is associated with a genetic mutation in the DYNC1H1 gene (the gene responsible also for one of the axonal types of Charcot–Marie–Tooth disease) and is inherited in an autosomal dominant manner. As with many genetic disorders, there is no known cure to SMALED1.

The condition was first described in a multi-generational family by Walter Timme in 1917. Its linkage to the DYNC1H1 gene was discovered in 2010 by M. B. Harms, et al., who also proposed the current name of the disorder.

== See also ==
- Spinal muscular atrophies
- Spinal muscular atrophy with lower extremity predominance 2A
- Spinal muscular atrophy with lower extremity predominance 2B
