= Distal spinal muscular atrophy type 2 =

- Other names: Autosomal recessive distal spinal muscular atrophy type 2
- This condition is inherited in an autosomal recessive manner
- Specialty: Neurology

Distal spinal muscular atrophy type 2 (DSMA2), also known as Jerash type distal hereditary motor neuropathy (HMNJ), is a very rare childhood-onset genetic disorder characterised by progressive muscle wasting affecting lower and subsequently upper limbs. The disorder has been described in Arab inhabitants of Jerash region in Jordan as well as in a Chinese family.

The condition is linked to a genetic mutation in the SIGMAR1 gene on chromosome 19 (locus 19p13.3) and is likely inherited in an autosomal recessive manner.

== See also ==
- Spinal muscular atrophies
- Distal hereditary motor neuropathies
