= DYNC1H1 =

Protein-coding gene in the species Homo sapiens

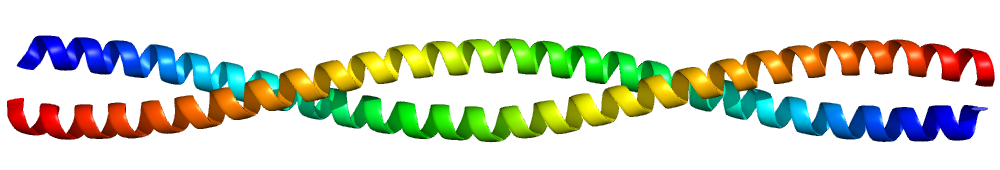

Identifiers
- Aliases: DYNC1H1, DHC1, DHC1a, DNCH1, DNCL, DNECL, DYHC, Dnchc1, HL-3, SMALED1, p22, CMT2O, dynein cytoplasmic 1 heavy chain 1
- External IDs: OMIM: 600112; MGI: 103147; GeneCards: DYNC1H1
Available structures
PDB	Ortholog search: PDBe RCSB
PDB	List of PDB id codes 2BOR, 2BOT

Gene location (Human)
Chr.	Chromosome 14 (human)
Band	14q32.31	Start	101,964,573 bp
Band	14q32.31	End	102,056,443 bp

Gene location (Mouse)
Chr.	Chromosome 12 (mouse)
Band	12 F1|12 60.7 cM	Start	110,567,886 bp
Band	12 F1|12 60.7 cM	End	110,633,379 bp
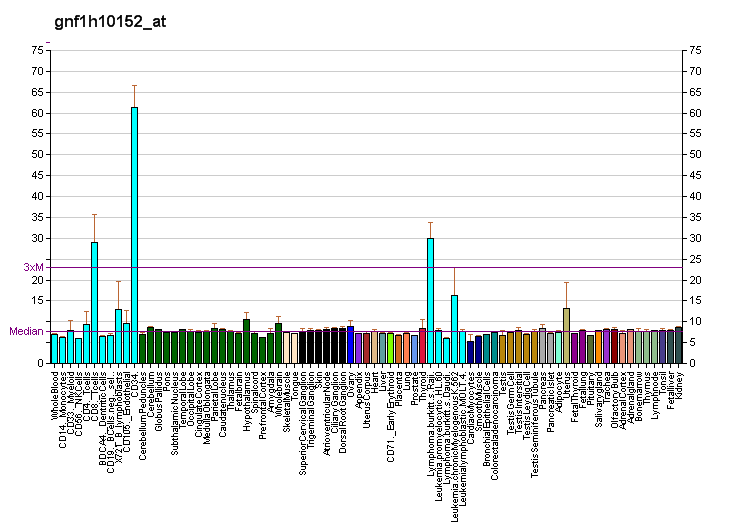

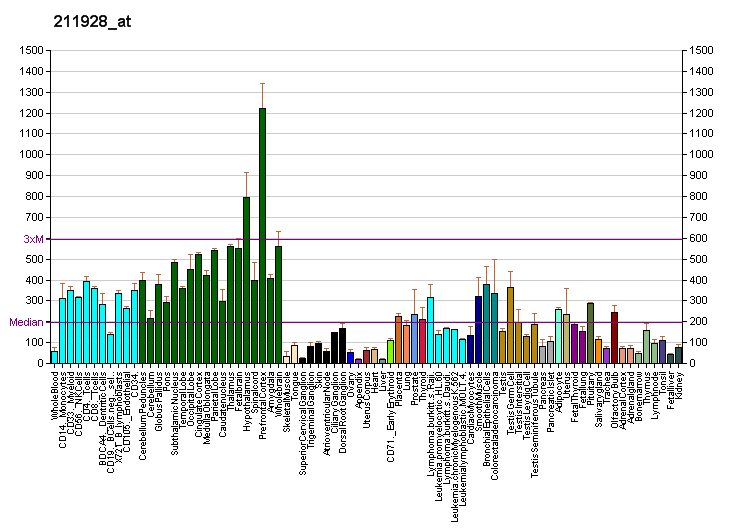
RNA expression pattern
Bgee	Human / Mouse (ortholog); Top expressed in: ganglionic eminence; ventricular zone; prefrontal cortex; stromal cell of endometrium; right frontal lobe; right hemisphere of cerebellum; Brodmann area 9; postcentral gyrus; lateral nuclear group of thalamus; C1 segment / Top expressed in: dentate gyrus of hippocampal formation granule cell; primary visual cortex; CA3 field; entorhinal cortex; superior frontal gyrus; perirhinal cortex; ventricular zone; external carotid artery; central gray substance of midbrain; facial motor nucleus; More reference expression data
BioGPS	More reference expression data
Gene ontology
Molecular function	microtubule motor activity; nucleotide binding; ATPase activity; protein binding; dynein light intermediate chain binding; cytoskeletal motor activity; ATP binding; RNA binding; minus-end-directed microtubule motor activity; dynein light chain binding; dynein intermediate chain binding
Cellular component	cytoplasm; cytosol; centrosome; membrane; filopodium; cytoplasmic dynein complex; dynein complex; microtubule; extracellular exosome; cytoskeleton; extracellular matrix; extracellular region; azurophil granule lumen; cytoplasmic microtubule; cell cortex; axon cytoplasm
Biological process	antigen processing and presentation of exogenous peptide antigen via MHC class II; establishment of spindle localization; mitotic spindle organization; endoplasmic reticulum to Golgi vesicle-mediated transport; microtubule-based movement; G2/M transition of mitotic cell cycle; P-body assembly; stress granule assembly; neutrophil degranulation; ciliary basal body-plasma membrane docking; regulation of mitotic spindle organization; positive regulation of intracellular transport; regulation of metaphase plate congression; positive regulation of spindle assembly; cytoplasmic microtubule organization; minus-end-directed vesicle transport along microtubule; cell cycle; cell division; sister chromatid cohesion; regulation of G2/M transition of mitotic cell cycle; transport; positive regulation of cold-induced thermogenesis; mitotic cell cycle; nuclear migration; retrograde axonal transport
Sources:Amigo / QuickGO
Orthologs
Databases	NCBI: entry; OMA: entry
Species	Human	Mouse
Entrez	1778	13424
Ensembl	ENSG00000197102	ENSMUSG00000018707
UniProt	Q14204	Q9JHU4
RefSeq (mRNA)	NM_001376	NM_030238
RefSeq (protein)	NP_001367	NP_084514
Location (UCSC)	Chr 14: 101.96 – 102.06 Mb	Chr 12: 110.57 – 110.63 Mb
PubMed search
- Wikidata
View/Edit Human	View/Edit Mouse

Cytoplasmic dynein 1 heavy chain 1 is a protein that in humans is encoded by the DYNC1H1 gene. Dynein is a molecular motor protein that is responsible for the transport of numerous cellular cargoes to minus ends of microtubules, which are typically found in the center of a cell, or the cell body of neurons. It is located on the 14th chromosome at position 14q32.31. Cytoplasmic dynein transports cargoes along the axon in the retrograde direction, bringing materials from the axon to the cell body. Dynein heavy chain binds microtubules and hydrolyzes ATP at its C-terminal head. It binds cargo via interaction with other dynein subunits at its N-terminal tail.

== Interactions ==
DYNC1H1 has been shown to interact with a large variety of proteins that act as adaptors and regulators. The dynein motor protein complex itself is a large, 1.4 MDa multimeric complex composed of dimerized heavy chains, two intermediate chains, two light intermediate chains, and additional light chains. Other well known adaptors and regulators are Dynactin, PAFAH1B1 and CDC5L.

== Clinical relevance ==
Defects in axonal transport, of which dynein plays a key role, have been implicated in conditions ranging from developmental defects in the brain to neurodegenerative disease. Mutations in the DYNC1H1 gene have been associated with epilepsy, neuromuscular disease, brain malformations, intellectual disability, autism, and neurodegenerative diseases. These as a whole are considered to be DYNC1H1-Related Disorders or dyneinopathies. Recent data implies that DYNC1H1-Related Disorders should be considered progressive, though the trigger and symptoms of that progress vary from patient to patient. As of September 1, 2024, nearly 1900 gene variants have been identified and classified as either pathogenic, likely pathogenic, or variants of unknown significance. The vast majority of these are missense mutations. Due to a high degree of pleiotropy, the genotype-phenotype spectrum is still developing. Given the heterogeneity of symptoms, large gene size, and the high conservation of the gene, it is likely that many patients remain undiagnosed. In recent larger cohort studies, the average age of patients was only 12 years old, likely due to symptoms overlap with other disorders like cerebral palsy and idiopathic autism and intellectual disability.

Prior to genetic testing, clinical diagnoses for these symptoms range from Charcot-Marie-Tooth disease as well as spinal muscular atrophy with lower extremity predominance 1 (SMA-LED1). Another symptom is Autosomal dominant non-syndromic intellectual disability. DYNC1H1 gene variants have been increasingly correlated with Amyotrophic lateral sclerosis, malformations of cortical development, and seizure disorders. It is estimated that roughly 40% of patients with DYNC1H1 gene variants have epilepsy, and 80-92% of those with DYNC1H1-related epilepsy have malformations of cortical development, including both lissencephaly and polymicrogyria.

== Society and Culture ==
The DYNC1H1 Association (dync1h1.org), a non-profit patient advocacy organization, was founded in 2023 with the goal of accelerating research into treatments for DYNC1H1-related disorders. The three founders are parents of children who have DYNC1H1-related disorders.
