= BICD2 =

Protein-coding gene in the species Homo sapiens

Identifiers
- Aliases: BICD2, SMALED2, bA526D8.1, BICD cargo adaptor 2, SMALED2B, SMALED2A
- External IDs: OMIM: 609797; MGI: 1924145; GeneCards: BICD2

Gene location (Human)
Chr.	Chromosome 9 (human)
Band	9q22.31	Start	92,711,363 bp
Band	9q22.31	End	92,764,833 bp

Gene location (Mouse)
Chr.	Chromosome 13 (mouse)
Band	13|13 A5	Start	49,495,061 bp
Band	13|13 A5	End	49,540,502 bp
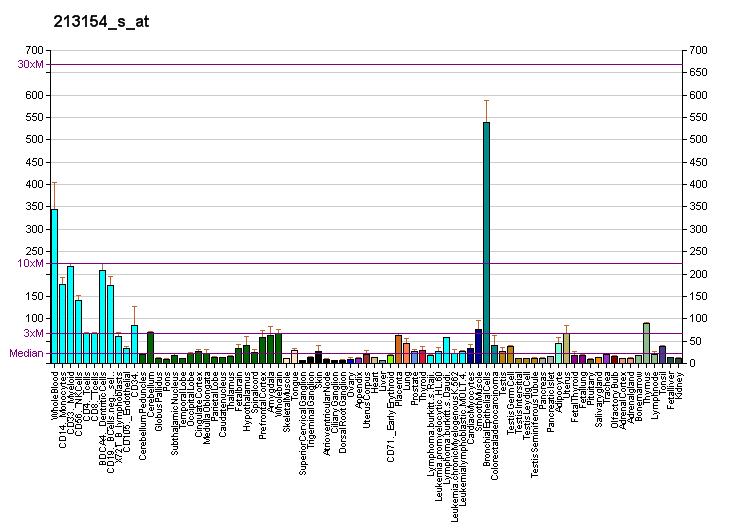

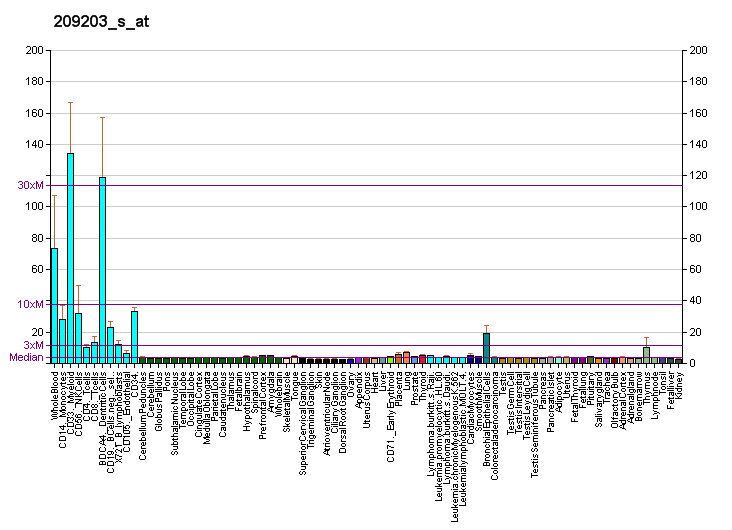

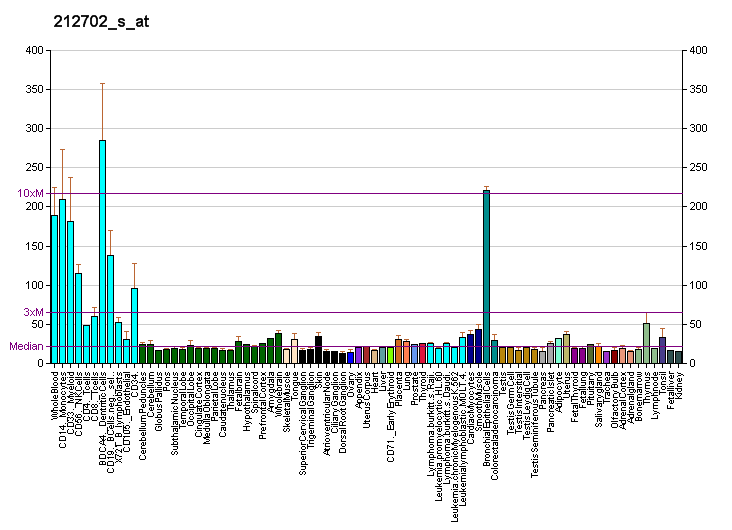
RNA expression pattern
Bgee	Human / Mouse (ortholog); Top expressed in: gingival epithelium; hair follicle; human penis; nipple; vulva; skin of arm; oral cavity; skin of thigh; skin of hip; mucosa of pharynx / Top expressed in: Rostral migratory stream; internal carotid artery; external carotid artery; trigeminal ganglion; interventricular septum; myocardium of ventricle; right lung lobe; skin of external ear; retinal pigment epithelium; atrioventricular valve; More reference expression data
BioGPS	More reference expression data
Gene ontology
Molecular function	protein binding; dynein light intermediate chain binding; dynactin binding; dynein complex binding; cytoskeletal anchor activity
Cellular component	plasma membrane; Golgi apparatus; cytoskeleton; cytoplasmic vesicle; nucleus; nuclear envelope; lamellae anulatae; nuclear pore; cytoplasm; cytosol; centrosome
Biological process	microtubule-based movement; minus-end-directed organelle transport along microtubule; microtubule anchoring at microtubule organizing center; retrograde vesicle-mediated transport, Golgi to endoplasmic reticulum; protein transport; mRNA transport; centrosome localization; transport; protein localization to Golgi apparatus; regulation of microtubule cytoskeleton organization
Sources:Amigo / QuickGO
Orthologs
Databases	NCBI: entry; OMA: entry
Species	Human	Mouse
Entrez	23299	76895
Ensembl	ENSG00000185963	ENSMUSG00000037933
UniProt	Q8TD16	Q921C5
RefSeq (mRNA)	NM_015250; NM_001003800	NM_001039179; NM_001039180; NM_029791
RefSeq (protein)	NP_001003800; NP_056065	NP_001034268; NP_001034269; NP_084067
Location (UCSC)	Chr 9: 92.71 – 92.76 Mb	Chr 13: 49.5 – 49.54 Mb
PubMed search
- Wikidata
View/Edit Human	View/Edit Mouse

Bicaudal D cargo adaptor 2 is a protein that in humans is encoded by the BICD2 gene.

This gene is one of two human homologs of Drosophila bicaudal-D and a member of the Bicoid family. It has been implicated in dynein-mediated, minus end-directed motility along microtubules. It has also been reported to be a phosphorylation target of NIMA related kinase 8. Two alternative splice variants have been described.

Mutations in BICD2 are associated with spinal muscular atrophy with lower extremity predominance type 2A and type 2B.
