= Diaphragmatic paradox =

Abnormal medical sign observed during respiration

- Differential diagnosis: hydropneumothorax

Diaphragmatic paradox or paradoxical diaphragm phenomenon is an abnormal medical sign observed during respiration, in which the diaphragm moves opposite to the normal directions of its movements. The diaphragm normally moves downwards during inspiration and upwards during expiration. But in diaphragmatic paradox, it moves upwards during inspiration and downwards during expiration.

== Causes and associated conditions ==
Diaphragmatic paradox may be caused by weakening of inspiratory muscles due to injury, pyopneumothorax (collection of pus and excess air inside pleural cavity) or hydropneumothorax (collection of watery fluid and excess air inside pleural cavity). Also caused due to phrenic nerve injury caused during cardiac surgery, radiation, trauma, etc. Viral infections like Herpes zoster and poliomyelitis can also cause this. In newborns this condition is seen in spinal muscular atrophy.

Rowland Payne Syndrome is a rare cause of unilateral diaphragmatic paralysis that can produce a diaphragmatic paradox. It involves concurrent dysfunction of the cervical sympathetic chain, recurrent laryngeal nerve, and phrenic nerve on the same side, leading to the clinical triad of Horner’s syndrome, vocal cord palsy, and hemidiaphragm paralysis. The syndrome is most often associated with malignant lesions of the lower neck or thoracic inlet, but can also follow trauma or infection.

== See also ==
- Flail chest (or Paradoxical breathing).
