= Spinal muscular atrophy with lower extremity predominance 2A =

Rare genetic disease

- Other names: Lower extremity-predominant spinal muscular atrophy type 2A, SMALED2A
- Spinal muscular atrophy with lower extremity predominance 2A is inherited in an autosomal dominant manner.
- Specialty: Neurology
- Symptoms: Muscle weakness in legs
- Usual onset: Infancy
- Duration: Lifetime
- Causes: Mutations in BICD2 gene
- Diagnostic method: Molecular test

Spinal muscular atrophy with lower extremity predominance 2A (SMALED2A) is a rare neuromuscular disorder characterised by muscle weakness predominantly in legs. The disorder is usually diagnosed shortly after birth; affected children have a delayed motor development, waddling gait, difficulties walking, sometimes develop spasticity. Sensation, swallowing and cognitive development are not affected. The disorder is slowly progressive throughout the lifetime.

The disease is caused by a mutation in the BICD2 gene and is passed on in an autosomal dominant manner.

There is no known cure for SMALED2A.

== See also ==
- Spinal muscular atrophies
- Spinal muscular atrophy with lower extremity predominance 1
- Spinal muscular atrophy with lower extremity predominance 2B
