= Spinal muscular atrophy with lower extremity predominance 2B =

Rare genetic disease

- Other names: Lower extremity-predominant spinal muscular atrophy type 2B, SMALED2B
- Spinal muscular atrophy with lower extremity predominance 2B is inherited in an autosomal dominant manner.
- Specialty: Neurology
- Symptoms: Generalised severe hypotonia at birth
- Usual onset: Infancy
- Duration: Lifetime
- Causes: Mutations in BICD2 gene
- Diagnostic method: Molecular test
- Prognosis: Life limiting

Spinal muscular atrophy with lower extremity predominance 2B (SMALED2B) is a rare neuromuscular disorder characterised by generalised muscle weakness.

== Indications ==
Decreased foetal movement is apparent already before birth. The child is born with a generalised muscle weakness (hypotonia) and contractures resembling arthrogryposis multiplex congenita, respiratory insufficiency, and sometimes facial deformations. The disorder is frequently fatal in early childhood.

== Cause ==
The disease is caused by a mutation in the BICD2 gene and is passed on in an autosomal dominant manner. There is no known cure to SMALED2B.

== See also ==
- Spinal muscular atrophies
- Spinal muscular atrophy with lower extremity predominance 1
- Spinal muscular atrophy with lower extremity predominance 2A
