= HSPB3 =

Protein-coding gene in the species Homo sapiens

Identifiers
- Aliases: HSPB3, DHMN2C, HMN2C, HSPL27, heat shock protein family B (small) member 3
- External IDs: OMIM: 604624; MGI: 1928479; GeneCards: HSPB3

Gene location (Human)
Chr.	Chromosome 5 (human)
Band	5q11.2	Start	54,455,699 bp
Band	5q11.2	End	54,456,377 bp

Gene location (Mouse)
Chr.	Chromosome 13 (mouse)
Band	13|13 D2.2	Start	113,799,432 bp
Band	13|13 D2.2	End	113,800,212 bp
RNA expression pattern
Bgee	Human / Mouse (ortholog); Top expressed in: right ventricle; myocardium of left ventricle; apex of heart; cardiac muscle tissue of right atrium; right auricle of heart; triceps brachii muscle; biceps brachii; Skeletal muscle tissue of biceps brachii; thoracic diaphragm; Skeletal muscle tissue of rectus abdominis / Top expressed in: temporal muscle; digastric muscle; sternocleidomastoid muscle; extraocular muscle; soleus muscle; triceps brachii muscle; quadriceps femoris muscle; interventricular septum; ankle; thoracic diaphragm; More reference expression data
BioGPS	n/a
Orthologs
Databases	NCBI: entry; OMA: entry
Species	Human	Mouse
Entrez	8988	56534
Ensembl	ENSG00000169271	ENSMUSG00000051456
UniProt	Q12988	Q9QZ57
RefSeq (mRNA)	NM_006308	NM_019960
RefSeq (protein)	NP_006299	NP_064344
Location (UCSC)	Chr 5: 54.46 – 54.46 Mb	Chr 13: 113.8 – 113.8 Mb
PubMed search
- Wikidata
View/Edit Human	View/Edit Mouse

Heat shock protein beta-3 (HspB3) also known as heat shock 27kDa protein 3 is a protein that in humans is encoded by the HSPB3 gene.

== Function ==
This gene encodes a muscle-specific small heat shock protein.

== Clinical significance ==
A mutation in this gene is the cause of autosomal dominant distal hereditary motor neuropathy type 2C.
