= IGHMBP2 =

Protein-coding gene in the species Homo sapiens

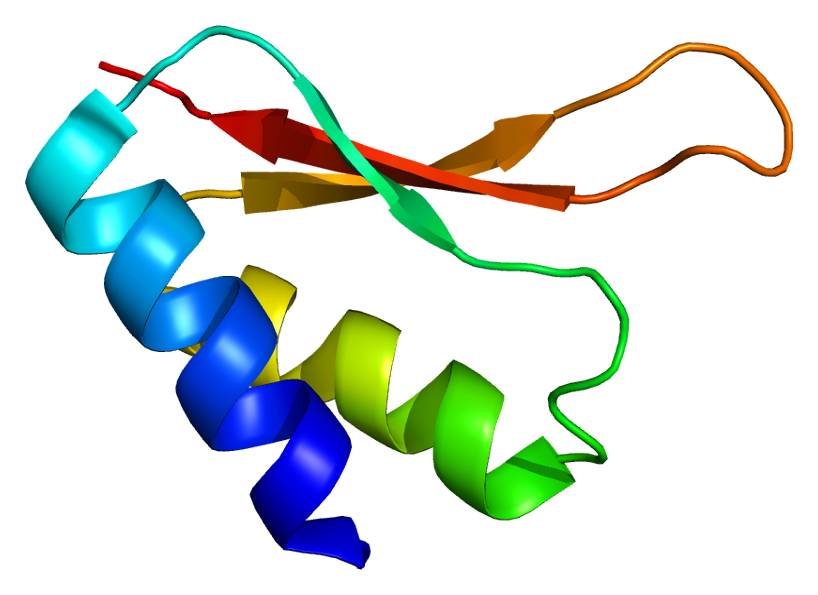

Identifiers
- Aliases: IGHMBP2, CATF1, HCSA, HMN6, SMARD1, SMUBP2, ZFAND7, CMT2S, immunoglobulin mu binding protein 2, immunoglobulin mu DNA binding protein 2
- External IDs: OMIM: 600502; MGI: 99954; GeneCards: IGHMBP2
Available structures
PDB	Ortholog search: PDBe RCSB
PDB	List of PDB id codes 1MSZ, 2LRR, 4B3F, 4B3G
Enzyme activity
EC #	BRENDA	ExPASy	KEGG	MetaCyc
5.6.2.3	↗	↗	↗	↗
5.6.2.5	↗	↗	↗	↗

Gene location (Human)
Chr.	Chromosome 11 (human)
Band	11q13.3	Start	68,903,863 bp
Band	11q13.3	End	68,940,602 bp

Gene location (Mouse)
Chr.	Chromosome 19 (mouse)
Band	19 A|19 3.03 cM	Start	3,309,076 bp
Band	19 A|19 3.03 cM	End	3,333,017 bp
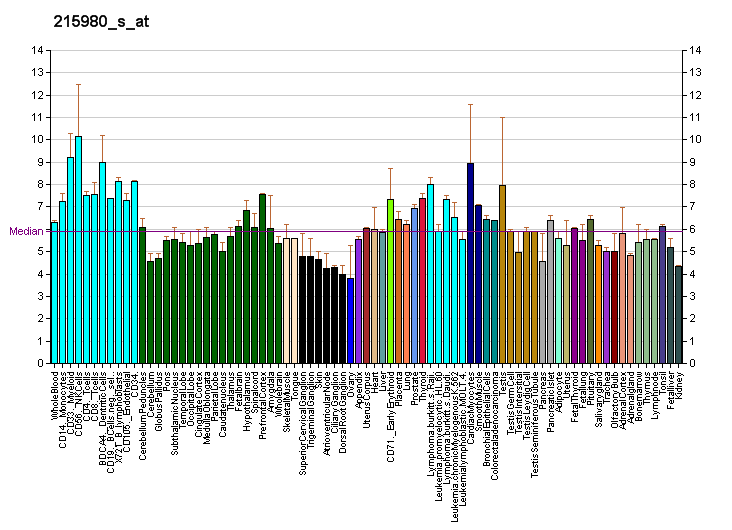

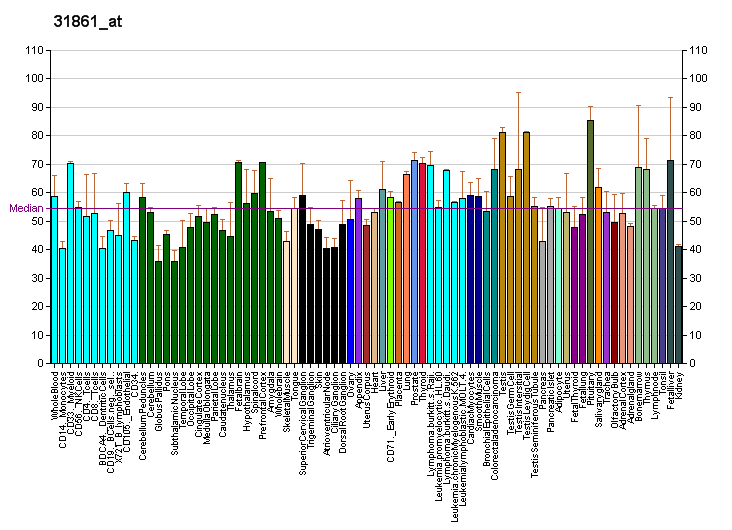
RNA expression pattern
Bgee	Human / Mouse (ortholog); Top expressed in: gastric mucosa; body of uterus; popliteal artery; tibial arteries; muscle layer of sigmoid colon; ascending aorta; sural nerve; right coronary artery; left coronary artery; canal of the cervix / Top expressed in: lumbar spinal ganglion; otic vesicle; Rostral migratory stream; saccule; urethra; male urethra; tail of embryo; ventricular zone; spermatocyte; muscle of thigh; More reference expression data
BioGPS	More reference expression data
Gene ontology
Molecular function	DNA binding; nucleotide binding; ATP-dependent activity, acting on DNA; 5'-3' DNA helicase activity; helicase activity; 5'-3' RNA helicase activity; ribosome binding; tRNA binding; zinc ion binding; transcription factor binding; metal ion binding; single-stranded DNA binding; DNA helicase activity; protein binding; RNA binding; nucleic acid binding; hydrolase activity; ATP binding; ATP-dependent activity, acting on RNA
Cellular component	cytoplasm; cell projection; membrane; growth cone; SMN complex; axon; nucleus; ribonucleoprotein complex
Biological process	DNA recombination; regulation of transcription, DNA-templated; transcription, DNA-templated; DNA replication; protein homooligomerization; DNA repair; DNA duplex unwinding; protein biosynthesis
Sources:Amigo / QuickGO
Orthologs
Databases	NCBI: entry; OMA: entry
Species	Human	Mouse
Entrez	3508	20589
Ensembl	ENSG00000132740	ENSMUSG00000024831
UniProt	P38935	P40694
RefSeq (mRNA)	NM_002180	NM_009212
RefSeq (protein)	NP_002171	n/a
Location (UCSC)	Chr 11: 68.9 – 68.94 Mb	Chr 19: 3.31 – 3.33 Mb
PubMed search
- Wikidata
View/Edit Human	View/Edit Mouse

DNA-binding protein SMUBP-2, also known as immunoglobulin helicase μ-binding protein 2 (IGHMBP2) and cardiac transcription factor 1 (CATF1) – is a protein that in humans is encoded by the IGHMBP2 gene.

Mutations in the IGHMBP2 gene cause distal spinal muscular atrophy type 1 (distal hereditary motor neuropathy type VI).
