= Congenital distal spinal muscular atrophy =

Hereditary condition characterized by muscle wasting

- Other names: congenital dSMA; distal hereditary motor neuropathy type VIII; distal hereditary motor neuronopathy type VIII; dHMN8; congenital benign spinal muscular atrophy with contractures
- Specialty: Paediatrics, medical genetics

Congenital distal spinal muscular atrophy (cDSMA), also known as distal hereditary motor neuropathy (or neuronopathy) type VIII (dHMN8), is a hereditary medical condition characterized by muscle wasting (atrophy), particularly of distal muscles in legs and hands, and by early-onset contractures (permanent shortening of a muscle or joint) of the hip, knee, and ankle. Affected individuals often have shorter lower limbs relative to the trunk and upper limbs. The condition is a result of a loss of anterior horn cells localized to lumbar and cervical regions of the spinal cord early in infancy, which in turn is caused by a mutation of the TRPV4 gene. The disorder is inherited in an autosomal dominant manner. Arm muscle and function, as well as cardiac and respiratory functions are typically well preserved.

== Signs and symptoms ==
The presentation is as follows:

- Neurogenic muscle weakness
- Atrophy (of lower and upper limbs)
- Club foot
- Arthrogryposis
- Scoliosis
- Platyspondyly
- Pes cavus
- Vocal cord paralysis

== Causes ==
Congenital distal spinal muscular atrophy is caused by a mutation of the TRPV4 gene found on the 12q23-12q24.1. The mutation causes an affected individual to have lower levels of TRPV4 expression. This deficiency can lead to abnormal osmotic regulation. Congenital dSMA is genetically heterogeneous, meaning a mutation on this gene can cause a plethora of other phenotypically related or phenotypically unrelated diseases depending on the region that is mutated.

== Pathophysiology ==
The TRPV4 (transient receptor potential vanilloid 4) gene, located on chromosome 12, encodes for a protein that serves as an ion channel, typically found in the plasma membrane and is permeable to Ca^{2+}. Abnormal regulation of Ca^{2+} can lead to inefficient muscle contraction. TRPV4 plays a major role in mechanosensation, as well as osmosensory functions in nerve endings, endothelia, and alveoli. The TRPV4 protein consists of 871 amino acids with its N- and C- terminals facing intracellularly. The protein also contains six alpha helices that pass through the plasma membrane. Mutations in TRPV4 can result in the loss of its normal function, or a toxic gain of function. In the latter case, intracellular Ca^{2+} levels are increased, which results in abnormal regulation.

=== Mechanism ===
The ankyrin repeat domain (ARD) is a region located near the intracellular N-terminal of the TRPV4 protein and consists of six ankyrin repeats. Four missense mutations have been identified at three specific positions all located within the ARD. All of these mutations are due to the swapping out of arginine with a different amino acid. Arginine is highly polar and positively charged, while its replacements are less polar or nonpolar. Some of these identified amino acid substitutions are:

- R296H, arginine to histidine substitution
- R315W, arginine to tryptophan substitution
- R316C, arginine to cysteine substitution
- R594H, arginine to histidine substitution

== Diagnosis ==
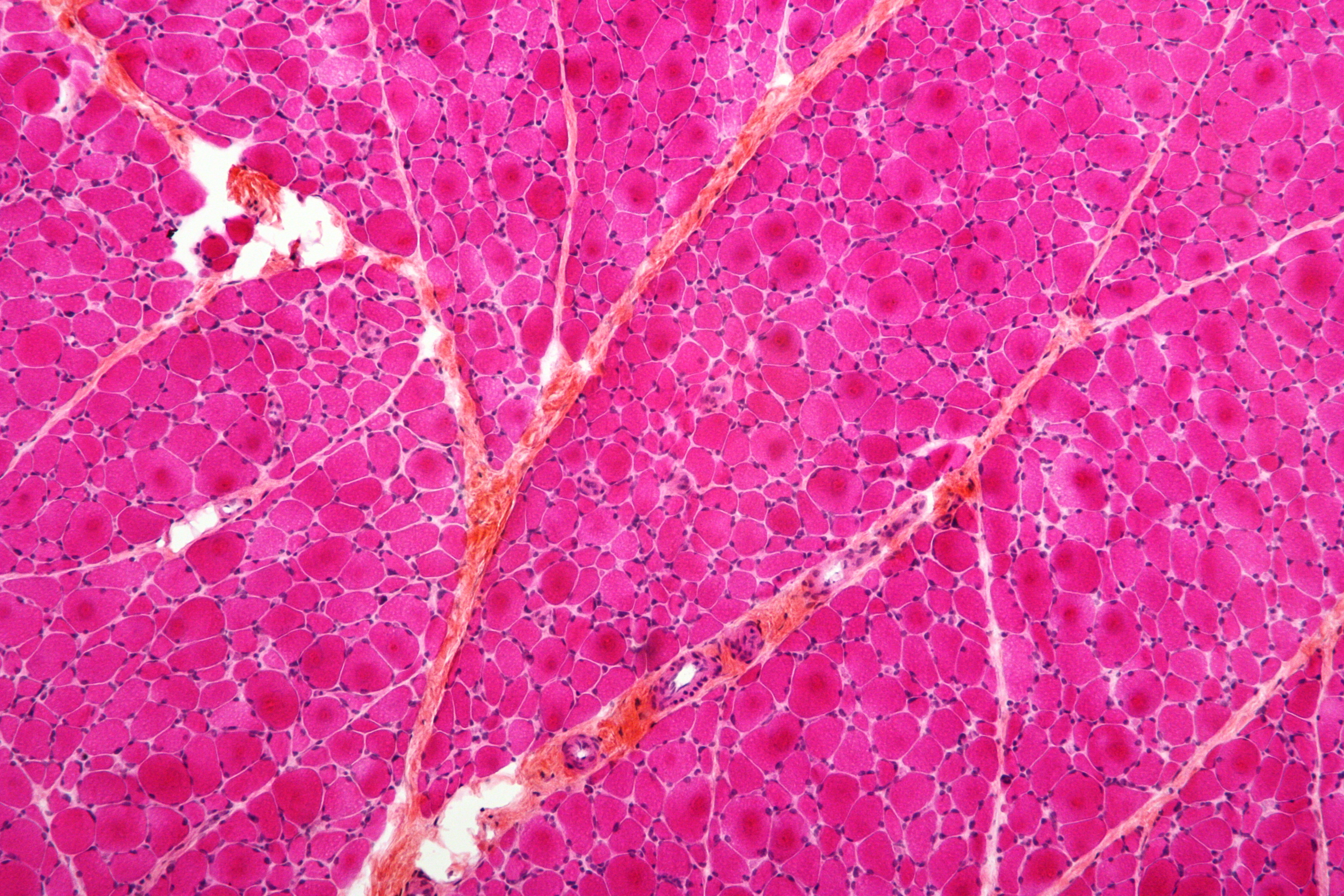
Denervation atrophy

Electrophysiological evidence of denervation with intact motor and sensory nerve conduction findings must be made by using nerve conduction studies, usually in conjunction with EMG. The presence of polyphasic potentials and fibrillation at rest are characteristic of congenital dSMA. The following are useful in diagnosis:

- Nerve conduction studies (NCS), to test for denervation
- Electromyography (EMG), also to detect denervation
- X-ray, to look for bone abnormalities
- Magnetic resonance imaging (MRI)
- Skeletal muscle biopsy examination
- Serum creatine kinase (CK) level in blood, usually elevated in affected individuals
- Pulmonary function test

== Management ==
Congenital dSMA has a relatively stable disease course, with disability mainly attributed to increased contractures rather than loss of muscle strength. Individuals frequently use crutches, knee, ankle, and/or foot orthoses, or wheelchairs. Orthopaedic surgery can be an option for some patients with severely impaired movement. Physical therapy and occupational therapy can help prevent further contractures from occurring, though they do not reverse the effects of preexisting ones. Some literature suggests the use of electrical stimulation or botulinum toxin to halt the progression of contractures.

== See also ==
- Spinal muscular atrophies
