= Diseases Database =

UK-based medical information database

- Website: www.diseasesdatabase.com

The Diseases Database is a free website that provides information about the relationships between medical conditions, symptoms, and medications. The database is run by Medical Object Oriented Software Enterprises Ltd, a company based in London.

The site's stated aim is "education, background reading and general interest" with an intended audience "physicians, other clinical healthcare workers and students of these professions". The editor of the site is stated as Malcolm H Duncan, a UK qualified medical doctor.

== Organization ==
The Diseases Database is based on a collection of about 8,500 concepts, called "items", related to human medicine including diseases, drugs, symptoms, physical signs and abnormal laboratory results.

In order to link items to both each other and external information resources three sets of metadata are modelled within the database.

1. Items are assigned various relationships e.g. diabetes mellitus type 2 is labelled "a risk factor for" ischaemic heart disease. More formally the database employs an entity–attribute–value model with items populating both entity and value slots. Relationships may be read in either direction e.g. the assertion "myocardial infarction {may cause} chest pain" has the corollary "chest pain {may be caused by} myocardial infarction". Such relationships aggregate within the database and allow lists to be retrieved - e.g. a list of items which may cause chest pain, and a list of items which may be caused by myocardial infarction.
2. Most items are assigned topic specific hyperlinks to Web resources which include Online Mendelian Inheritance in Man, eMedicine and Wikipedia.
3. Most items are mapped to concepts within the Unified Medical Language System (UMLS). UMLS links enable the display of short text definitions or Medical Subject Heading (MeSH) scope notes for the majority of items on the database.

The UMLS map also enables links to and from other medical classifications and terminologies e.g. ICD-9 and SNOMED.
