= DNAJB2 =

Protein-coding gene in the species Homo sapiens

Identifiers
- Aliases: DNAJB2, DSMA5, HSJ-1, HSJ1, HSPF3, CMT2T, DnaJ heat shock protein family (Hsp40) member B2
- External IDs: OMIM: 604139; MGI: 1928739; GeneCards: DNAJB2
Available structures
PDB	Ortholog search: PDBe RCSB
PDB	List of PDB id codes 2LGW

Gene location (Human)
Chr.	Chromosome 2 (human)
Band	2q35	Start	219,279,342 bp
Band	2q35	End	219,286,898 bp

Gene location (Mouse)
Chr.	Chromosome 1 (mouse)
Band	1|1 C4	Start	75,236,406 bp
Band	1|1 C4	End	75,245,692 bp
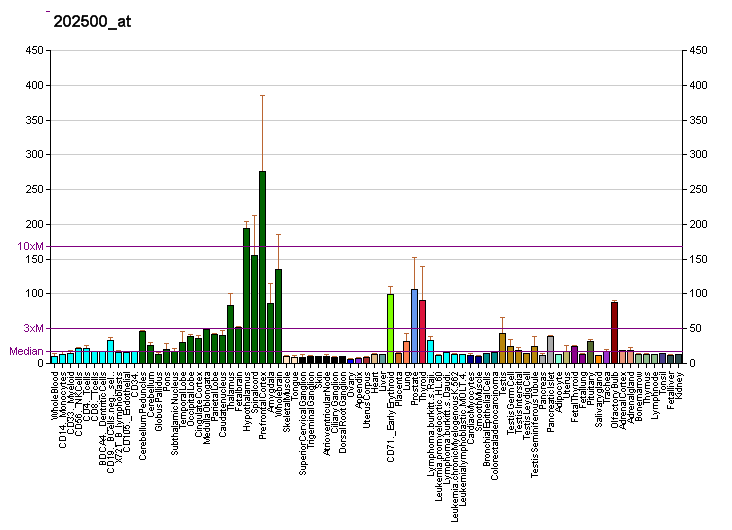
RNA expression pattern
Bgee	Human / Mouse (ortholog); Top expressed in: C1 segment; right hemisphere of cerebellum; right frontal lobe; anterior pituitary; amygdala; cingulate gyrus; anterior cingulate cortex; prefrontal cortex; Brodmann area 9; tibial nerve / Top expressed in: motor neuron; lens; spermatid; neural layer of retina; supraoptic nucleus; retinal pigment epithelium; spermatocyte; muscle of thigh; aortic valve; blood; More reference expression data
BioGPS	More reference expression data
Gene ontology
Molecular function	polyubiquitin modification-dependent protein binding; proteasome binding; chaperone binding; protein binding; ubiquitin protein ligase binding; ATPase activator activity; Hsp70 protein binding; unfolded protein binding; ubiquitin binding; ubiquitin-dependent protein binding
Cellular component	inclusion body; proteasome complex; cytosol; nucleus; cytoplasm; endoplasmic reticulum; endoplasmic reticulum membrane; membrane; intrinsic component of endoplasmic reticulum membrane; nuclear membrane
Biological process	response to unfolded protein; negative regulation of protein deubiquitination; positive regulation of protein ubiquitination; positive regulation of proteasomal ubiquitin-dependent protein catabolic process; ubiquitin-dependent ERAD pathway; protein refolding; negative regulation of inclusion body assembly; regulation of protein localization; regulation of protein ubiquitination; negative regulation of protein binding; positive regulation of ATP-dependent activity; proteasome-mediated ubiquitin-dependent protein catabolic process; chaperone-mediated protein folding; regulation of chaperone-mediated protein folding; negative regulation of cell population proliferation; negative regulation of cell growth; neuron cellular homeostasis
Sources:Amigo / QuickGO
Orthologs
Databases	NCBI: entry; OMA: entry
Species	Human	Mouse
Entrez	3300	56812
Ensembl	ENSG00000135924	ENSMUSG00000026203
UniProt	P25686	Q9QYI5
RefSeq (mRNA)	NM_006736; NM_001039550	NM_001159883; NM_001159884; NM_001159885; NM_020266; NM_178055
RefSeq (protein)	NP_001034639; NP_006727	NP_001153355; NP_001153356; NP_001153357; NP_064662; NP_835156
Location (UCSC)	Chr 2: 219.28 – 219.29 Mb	Chr 1: 75.24 – 75.25 Mb
PubMed search
- Wikidata
View/Edit Human	View/Edit Mouse

DnaJ homolog subfamily B member 2 is a protein that in humans is encoded by the DNAJB2 gene.
