= Glycine–tRNA ligase =

Protein found in humans

Identifiers
- EC no.: 6.1.1.14
- CAS no.: 9037-62-1

Databases
- BRENDA: enzyme data
- ExPASy: NiceZyme view
- KEGG: enzyme entry
- MetaCyc: metabolic pathway
- Rhea: reactions
- PDB structures: RCSB PDB PDBe PDBsum
- Gene Ontology: AmiGO / QuickGO
Search
- PMC: articles
- PubMed: articles
- NCBI: proteins

GARS1
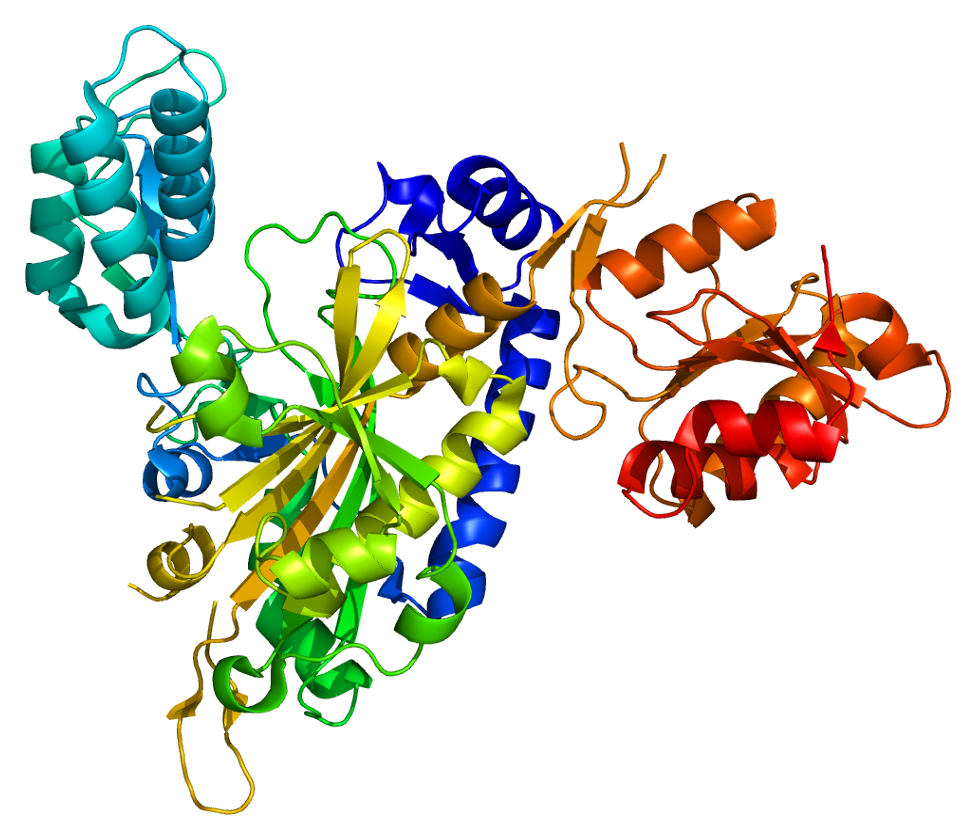

Identifiers
- Aliases: GARS1, CMT2D, DSMAV, GlyRS, HMN5, SMAD1, glycyl-tRNA synthetase, GARS, glycyl-tRNA synthetase 1, HMN5A, SMAJI
- External IDs: OMIM: 600287; MGI: 2449057; GeneCards: GARS1
Available structures
PDB	Ortholog search: PDBe RCSB
PDB	List of PDB id codes 2PME, 2PMF, 2Q5H, 2Q5I, 2ZT5, 2ZT6, 2ZT7, 2ZT8, 2ZXF, 4KQE, 4KR2, 4QEI, 5E6M
Enzyme activity
EC #	BRENDA	ExPASy	KEGG	MetaCyc
6.1.1.14	↗	↗	↗	↗

Gene location (Human)
Chr.	Chromosome 7 (human)
Band	7p14.3	Start	30,580,533 bp
Band	7p14.3	End	30,634,033 bp

Gene location (Mouse)
Chr.	Chromosome 6 (mouse)
Band	6 B3|6 27.29 cM	Start	55,014,992 bp
Band	6 B3|6 27.29 cM	End	55,056,485 bp
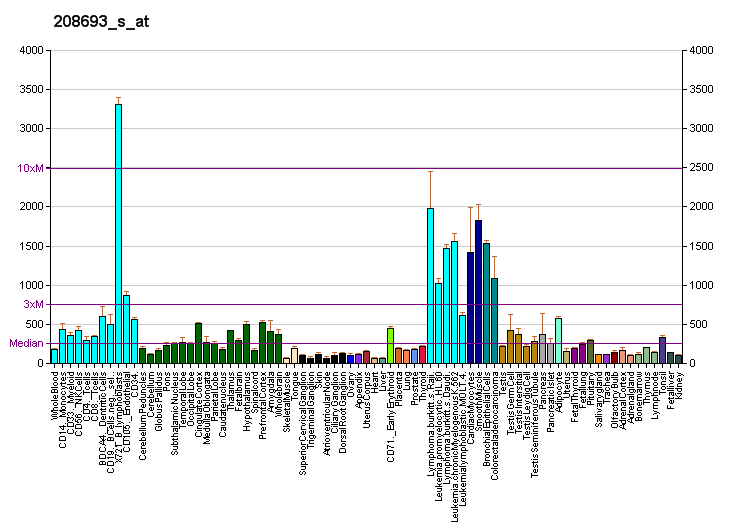
RNA expression pattern
Bgee	Human / Mouse (ortholog); Top expressed in: secondary oocyte; cartilage tissue; lateral nuclear group of thalamus; middle temporal gyrus; tibia; spinal ganglia; pars compacta; stromal cell of endometrium; islet of Langerhans; mucosa of pharynx / Top expressed in: somite; fetal liver hematopoietic progenitor cell; epiblast; endocardial cushion; maxillary prominence; primitive streak; mandibular prominence; facial motor nucleus; Paneth cell; calvaria; More reference expression data
BioGPS	More reference expression data
Gene ontology
Molecular function	aminoacyl-tRNA ligase activity; nucleotide binding; ligase activity; protein dimerization activity; ATP binding; bis(5'-nucleosyl)-tetraphosphatase (asymmetrical) activity; hydrolase activity; protein binding; identical protein binding; glycine-tRNA ligase activity; transferase activity
Cellular component	axon; mitochondrial matrix; cell projection; secretory granule; cytosol; extracellular exosome; extracellular region; cytoplasm; mitochondrion
Biological process	diadenosine tetraphosphate biosynthetic process; protein biosynthesis; glycyl-tRNA aminoacylation; mitochondrial glycyl-tRNA aminoacylation; tRNA aminoacylation for protein translation
Sources:Amigo / QuickGO
Orthologs
Databases	NCBI: entry; OMA: entry
Species	Human	Mouse
Entrez	2617	353172
Ensembl	ENSG00000106105	ENSMUSG00000029777
UniProt	P41250	Q9CZD3
RefSeq (mRNA)	NM_002047; NM_001316772	NM_180678
RefSeq (protein)	NP_001303701; NP_002038	NP_851009
Location (UCSC)	Chr 7: 30.58 – 30.63 Mb	Chr 6: 55.01 – 55.06 Mb
PubMed search
- Wikidata
View/Edit Human	View/Edit Mouse

Glycine–tRNA ligase also known as glycyl-tRNA synthetase is an enzyme that in humans is encoded by the GARS1 gene (previously GARS).

== Function ==
This gene encodes glycyl-tRNA synthetase, one of the aminoacyl-tRNA synthetases that charge tRNAs with their cognate amino acids. The encoded enzyme is an (alpha)2 dimer which belongs to the class II family of tRNA synthetases.

== Reaction ==
In enzymology, a glycine–tRNA ligase (EC 6.1.1.14) is an enzyme that catalyzes the chemical reaction

ATP + glycine + tRNA^{Gly} $\rightleftharpoons$ AMP + diphosphate + glycyl-tRNA^{Gly}

The 3 substrates of this enzyme are ATP, glycine, and tRNA^{Gly}, whereas its 3 products are AMP, diphosphate, and glycyl-tRNA^{Gly}.

This enzyme belongs to the family of ligases, to be specific those forming carbon–oxygen bonds in aminoacyl-tRNA and related compounds. The systematic name of this enzyme class is glycine:tRNA^{Gly} ligase (AMP-forming). Other names in common use include glycyl-tRNA synthetase, glycyl-transfer ribonucleate synthetase, glycyl-transfer RNA synthetase, glycyl-transfer ribonucleic acid synthetase, and glycyl translase. This enzyme participates in glycine, serine and threonine metabolism and aminoacyl-tRNA biosynthesis.

== Interactions ==
Glycyl-tRNA synthetase has been shown to interact with EEF1D. Mutant forms of the protein associated with peripheral nerve disease have been shown to aberrantly bind to the transmembrane receptor proteins neuropilin 1 and Trk receptors A-C.

== Clinical relevance ==
Glycyl-tRNA synthetase has been shown to be a target of autoantibodies in the human autoimmune diseases, polymyositis or dermatomyositis.

The peripheral nerve diseases Charcot–Marie–Tooth disease type 2D (CMT2D) and distal spinal muscular atrophy type V (dSMA-V) have been liked to dominant mutations in GARS. CMT2D usually manifests during the teenage years, and results in muscle weakness predominantly in the hands and feet. Two mouse models of CMT2D have been used to better understand the disease, identifying that the disorder is caused by a toxic gain-of-function of the mutant glycine-tRNA ligase protein. The CMT2D mice display peripheral nerve axon degeneration and defective development and function of the neuromuscular junction.
