= FBXO38 =

Protein-coding gene in the species Homo sapiens

Identifiers
- Aliases: FBXO38, Fbx38, HMN2D, MOKA, SP329, F-box protein 38, FBX38
- External IDs: OMIM: 608533; MGI: 2444639; GeneCards: FBXO38

Gene location (Human)
Chr.	Chromosome 5 (human)
Band	5q32	Start	148,383,935 bp
Band	5q32	End	148,442,836 bp

Gene location (Mouse)
Chr.	Chromosome 18 (mouse)
Band	18|18 E1	Start	62,504,155 bp
Band	18|18 E1	End	62,548,695 bp
RNA expression pattern
Bgee	Human / Mouse (ortholog); Top expressed in: Achilles tendon; endothelial cell; germinal epithelium; corpus callosum; epithelium of colon; blood; epithelium of nasopharynx; bone marrow; sural nerve; stromal cell of endometrium / Top expressed in: saccule; otic placode; otic vesicle; Ileal epithelium; granulocyte; endocardial cushion; blood; median eminence; spermatocyte; arcuate nucleus; More reference expression data
BioGPS	n/a
Orthologs
Databases	NCBI: entry; OMA: entry
Species	Human	Mouse
Entrez	81545	107035
Ensembl	ENSG00000145868	ENSMUSG00000042211
UniProt	Q6PIJ6	Q8BMI0
RefSeq (mRNA)	NM_001271723; NM_030793; NM_205836	NM_134136; NM_001361088; NM_001361089; NM_001361090; NM_001361091
RefSeq (protein)	NP_001258652; NP_110420; NP_995308	NP_598897; NP_001348017; NP_001348018; NP_001348019; NP_001348020
Location (UCSC)	Chr 5: 148.38 – 148.44 Mb	Chr 18: 62.5 – 62.55 Mb
PubMed search
- Wikidata
View/Edit Human	View/Edit Mouse

F-box only protein 38 (FBXO38) is a protein that in humans is encoded by the FBXO38 gene.

Mutations in the FBXO38 gene are associated with distal spinal muscular atrophy with calf predominance. FBXO38 controls the composition of centromeric chromatin via the stability of ZXDA/B nuclear factors. Mice deficient in Fbxo38 gene have defective spermatogenesis and are growth retarded.
