= Atrophy =

Partial or complete wasting away of a part of the body

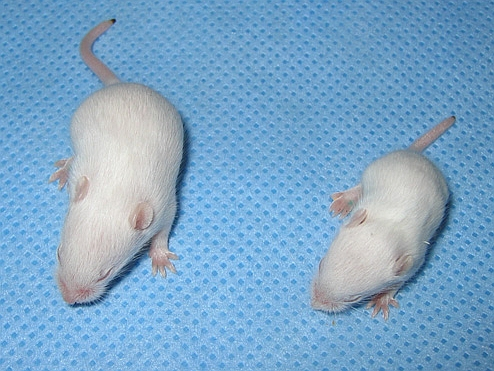
- Mouse (right) with spinal muscular atrophy
- Specialty: Pathology
- Symptoms: Loss of body cells, signs of ageing
- Types: Muscular atrophy, gland atrophy
- Causes: Poor nourishment, poor circulation, loss of hormonal support, loss of nerve supply to target organ(s), excessive apoptosis of cells, insufficient exercise, ageing
- Risk factors: Old age, sedentary lifestyle
- Prognosis: Depends on the cause

Atrophy is the partial or complete wasting away of a part of the body. Causes of atrophy include mutations (which can destroy the gene to build up the organ), poor nourishment, poor circulation, loss of hormonal support, loss of nerve supply to the target organ, excessive amount of apoptosis of cells, and disuse or lack of exercise or disease intrinsic to the tissue itself. In medical practice, hormonal and nerve inputs that maintain an organ or body part are said to have trophic effects. A diminished muscular trophic condition is designated as atrophy. Atrophy is reduction in size of cell, organ or tissue, after attaining its normal mature growth. In contrast, hypoplasia is the reduction in the cellular numbers of an organ, or tissue that has not attained normal maturity.

Atrophy is the general physiological process of reabsorption and breakdown of tissues, involving apoptosis. When it occurs as a result of disease or loss of trophic support because of other diseases, it is termed pathological atrophy, although it can be a part of normal body development and homeostasis as well.

== Normal development ==
Examples of atrophy as part of normal development include shrinking and the involution of the thymus in early childhood, and the tonsils in adolescence. In old age, effects include, but are not limited to, loss of teeth, hair, thinning of skin that creates wrinkles, weakening of muscles, loss of weight in organs and sluggish mental activity.

== Muscle atrophies ==
Disuse atrophy of muscles and bones, with loss of mass and strength, can occur after prolonged immobility, such as extended bedrest, or having a body part in a cast (living in darkness for the eye, bedridden for the legs etc.). This type of atrophy can usually be reversed with exercise unless severe.

There are many diseases and conditions which cause atrophy of muscle mass. For example, diseases such as cancer and AIDS induce a body wasting syndrome called cachexia, which is notable for the severe muscle atrophy seen. Other syndromes or conditions which can induce skeletal muscle atrophy are congestive heart failure and liver disease.

During aging, there is a gradual decrease in the ability to maintain skeletal muscle function and mass. This condition is called sarcopenia, and may be distinct from atrophy in its pathophysiology. While the exact cause of sarcopenia is unknown, it may be induced by a combination of a gradual failure in the satellite cells which help to regenerate skeletal muscle fibers, and a decrease in sensitivity to or the availability of critical secreted growth factors which are necessary to maintain muscle mass and satellite cell survival.

== Dystrophies, myositis, and motor neuron conditions ==
Pathologic atrophy of muscles can occur with diseases of the motor nerves or diseases of the muscle tissue itself. Examples of atrophying nerve diseases include Charcot-Marie-Tooth disease, poliomyelitis, amyotrophic lateral sclerosis (ALS or Lou Gehrig's disease), and Guillain–Barré syndrome. Examples of atrophying muscle diseases include muscular dystrophy, myotonia congenita, and myotonic dystrophy.

Changes in Na+ channel isoform expression and spontaneous activity in muscle called fibrillation can also result in muscle atrophy.

A flail limb is a medical term which refers to an extremity in which the primary nerve has been severed, resulting in complete lack of mobility and sensation. The muscles soon wither away from atrophy.

== Gland atrophy ==
The adrenal glands atrophy during prolonged use of exogenous glucocorticoids like prednisone. Atrophy of the breasts can occur with prolonged estrogen reduction, as with anorexia nervosa or menopause. Testicular atrophy can occur with prolonged use of enough exogenous sex steroids (either androgen or estrogen) to reduce gonadotropin secretion.

== Vaginal atrophy ==
In post-menopausal women, the walls of the vagina become thinner (atrophic vaginitis). The mechanism for the age-related condition is not yet clear, though there are theories that the effect is caused by decreases in estrogen levels. This atrophy, occurring concurrently with breast atrophy, is consistent with the homeostatic (normal development) role of atrophy in general, as after menopause the body has no further functional biological need to maintain the reproductive system which it has permanently shut down.

== Research ==
One drug in test seemed to prevent the type of muscle loss that occurs in immobile, bedridden patients. Testing on mice showed that it blocked the activity of a protein present in the muscle that is involved in muscle atrophy. However, the drug's long-term effect on the heart precludes its routine use in humans, and other drugs are being sought.

== See also ==
- Olivopontocerebellar atrophy
- Optic atrophy
- Spinomuscular atrophy
- Hypertrophy
- Deconditioning
- List of biological development disorders
