= Sadhu =

Religious ascetic or holy person in Hinduism

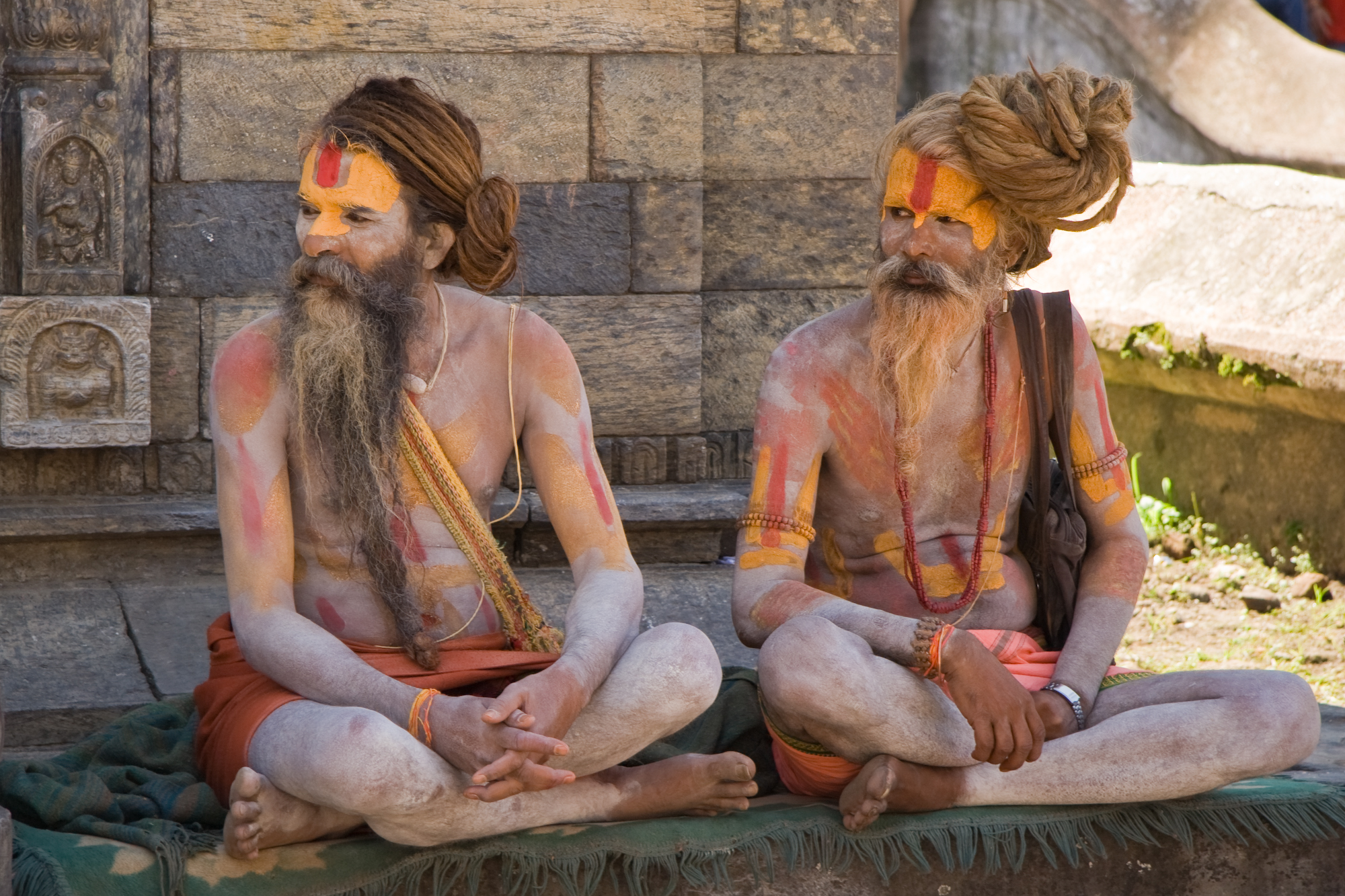
Two sadhus near Pashupatinath temple in Kathmandu

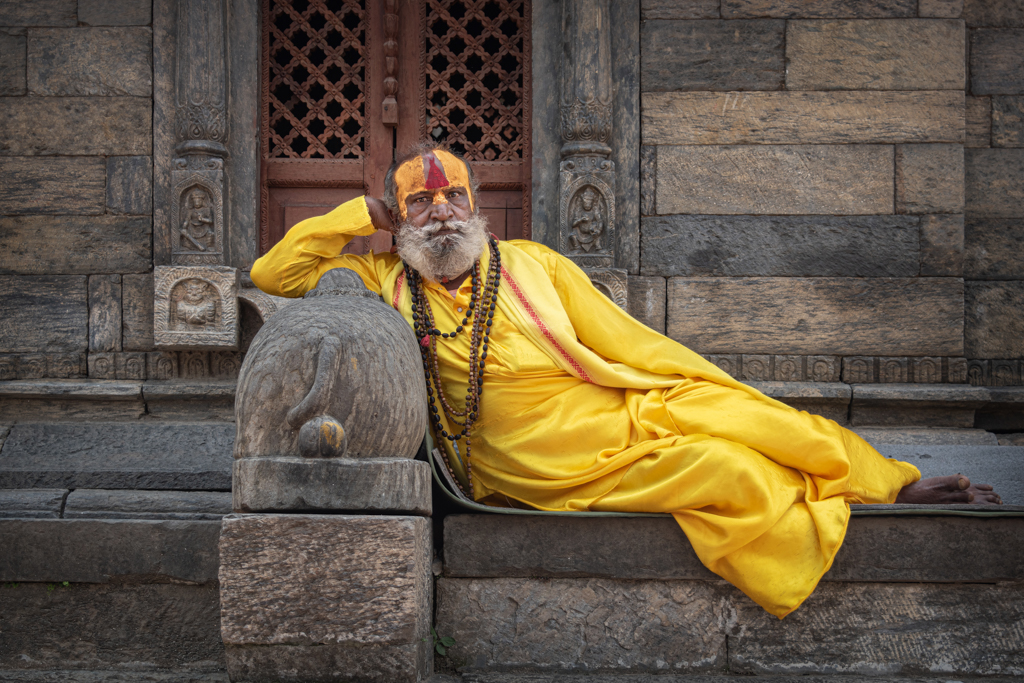
Sadhu in Pashupatinath Temple, Kathmandu, Nepal.

Sadhu (Sanskrit: साधु, IAST: sādhu (male), sādhvī or sādhvīne (female), also spelled saddhu) is a religious ascetic, mendicant or any holy person in Hinduism and Jainism who has renounced the worldly life. They are sometimes alternatively referred to as yogi, sannyasi or vairagi.

Sādhu means one who follows a path of sadhana (spiritual discipline). Although the vast majority of sādhus are yogīs, not all yogīs are sādhus. A sādhu's life is solely dedicated to achieving mokṣa (liberation from the cycle of death and rebirth), the fourth and final aśrama (stage of life), through meditation and contemplation of Brahman. Sādhus often wear simple clothing, such as saffron-coloured clothing in Hinduism and white or nothing in Jainism, symbolising their sannyāsa (renunciation of worldly possessions). A female mendicant in Hinduism and Jainism is often called a sadhvi, or in some texts as aryika.

In Sikhism, a person who has become Brahmgiani is considered a sadhu. However, asceticism, celibacy and begging are prohibited in Sikhism.

== Etymology ==
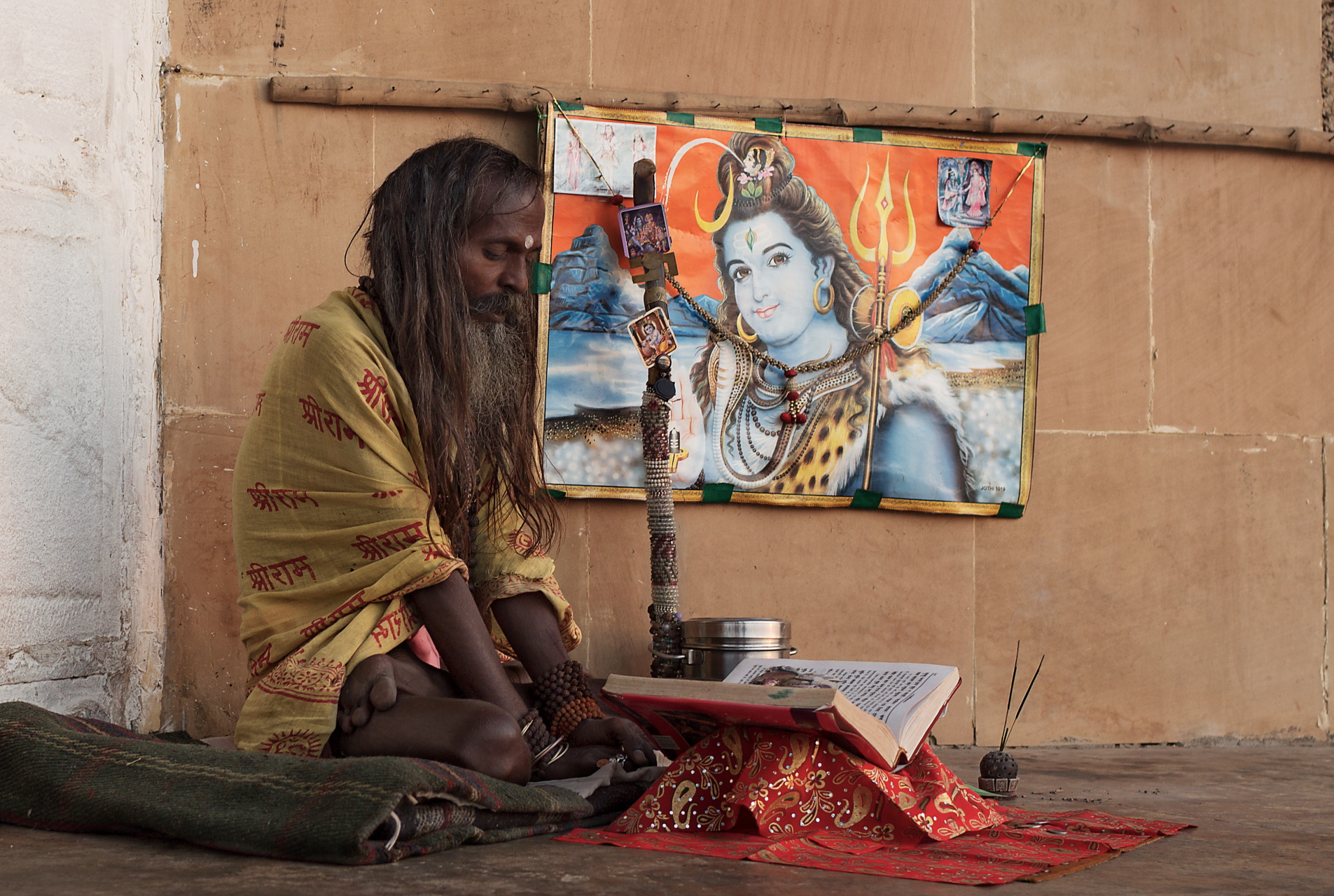
A sadhu in yoga position, reading a book in Varanasi

The term sadhu (Sanskrit: साधु) appears in Rigveda and Atharvaveda where it means "straight, right, leading straight to goal", according to Monier Monier-Williams. (Note: See for example: अग्ने विश्वेभिः स्वनीक देवैरूर्णावन्तं प्रथमः सीद योनिम् । कुलायिनं घृतवन्तं सवित्रे यज्ञं नय यजमानाय साधु ॥१६॥ – Rigveda 6.15.16 (Rigveda Hymn सूक्तं ६.१५, Wikisource) प्र यज्ञ एतु हेत्वो न सप्तिरुद्यच्छध्वं समनसो घृताचीः । स्तृणीत बर्हिरध्वराय साधूर्ध्वा शोचींषि देवयून्यस्थुः ॥२॥ – Rigveda 7.43.2 (Rigveda Hymn सूक्तं ७.४३, Wikisource) यथाहान्यनुपूर्वं भवन्ति यथ ऋतव ऋतुभिर्यन्ति साधु । यथा न पूर्वमपरो जहात्येवा धातरायूंषि कल्पयैषाम् ॥५॥ – Rigveda 10.18.5 (Rigveda Hymn सूक्तं १०.१८, Wikisource), etc.) In the Brahmanas layer of Vedic literature, the term connotes someone who is "well disposed, kind, willing, effective or efficient, peaceful, secure, good, virtuous, honourable, righteous, noble" depending on the context. In the Hindu Epics, the term implies someone who is a "saint, sage, seer, holy man, virtuous, chaste, honest or right".

The Sanskrit terms sādhu ("good man") and sādhvī ("good woman") refer to renouncers who have chosen to live lives apart from or on the edges of society to focus on their own spiritual practices.

The words come from the root sādh, which means to "reach one's goal", "straighten", or "master". The same root is used in the word sādhanā, which means "spiritual practice".

== Demographics and lifestyle ==
Sadhus are widely considered holy. It is also thought that the austere practices of the sadhus help to burn off their karma and that of the community at large. Thus seen as benefiting society, sadhus are supported by donations from many people. However, reverence of sadhus is by no means universal in India. For example, Nath yogi sadhus have been viewed with a certain degree of suspicion particularly amongst the urban populations of India, but they have been revered and are popular in rural India.

There are naked (digambara, or "sky-clad") sadhus who wear their hair in thick dreadlocks called jata. Sadhus engage in a wide variety of religious practices. Some practice asceticism and solitary meditation, while others prefer group praying, chanting or meditating. They typically live a simple lifestyle, and have very few or no possessions. Many sadhus have rules for alms collection, and do not visit the same place twice on different days to avoid bothering the residents. They generally walk or travel over distant places, homeless, visiting temples and pilgrimage centers as a part of their spiritual practice. Celibacy is common, but some sects experiment with consensual tantric sex as a part of their practice. Sex is viewed by them as a transcendence from a personal, intimate act to something impersonal and ascetic.

== Sadhu sects ==
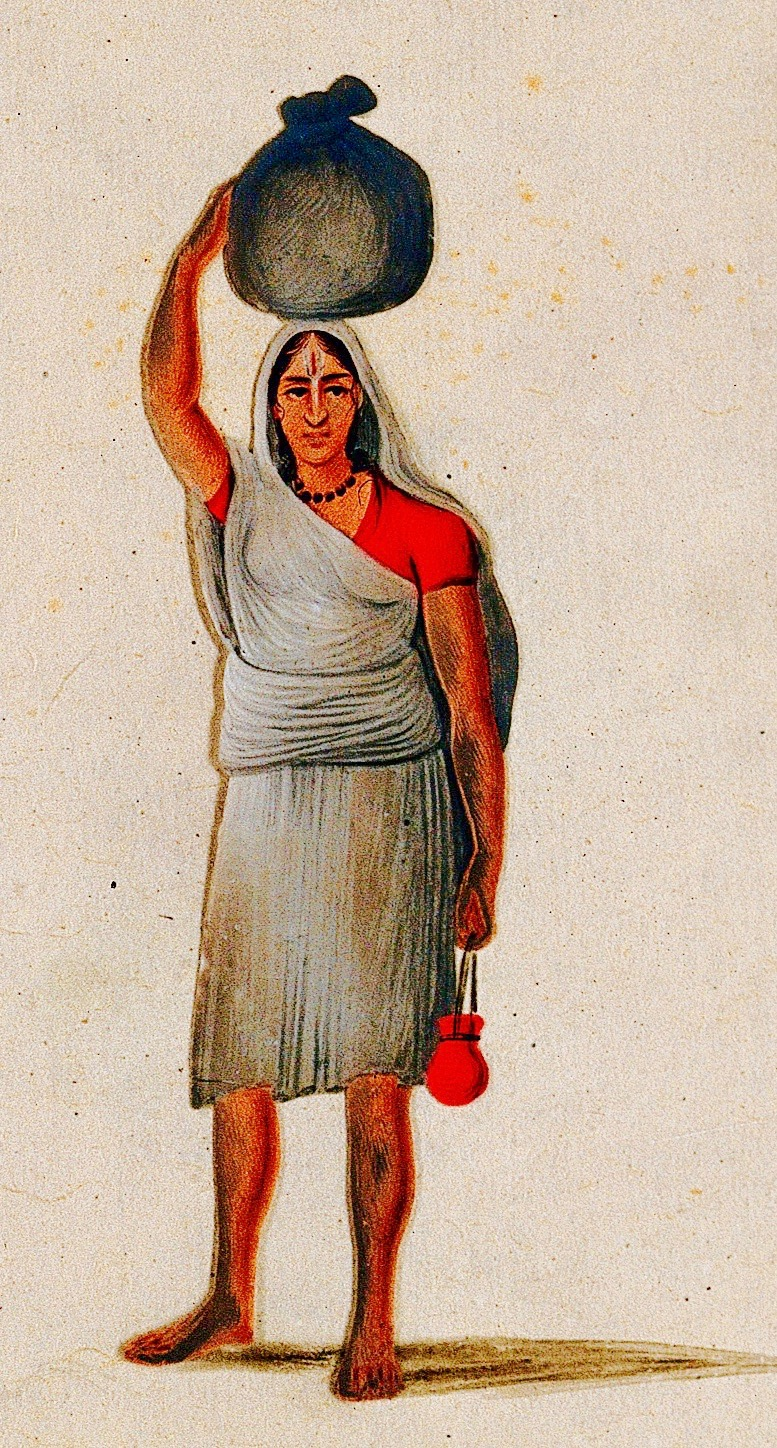
A female sadhvi with a Vishnu mark on her forehead

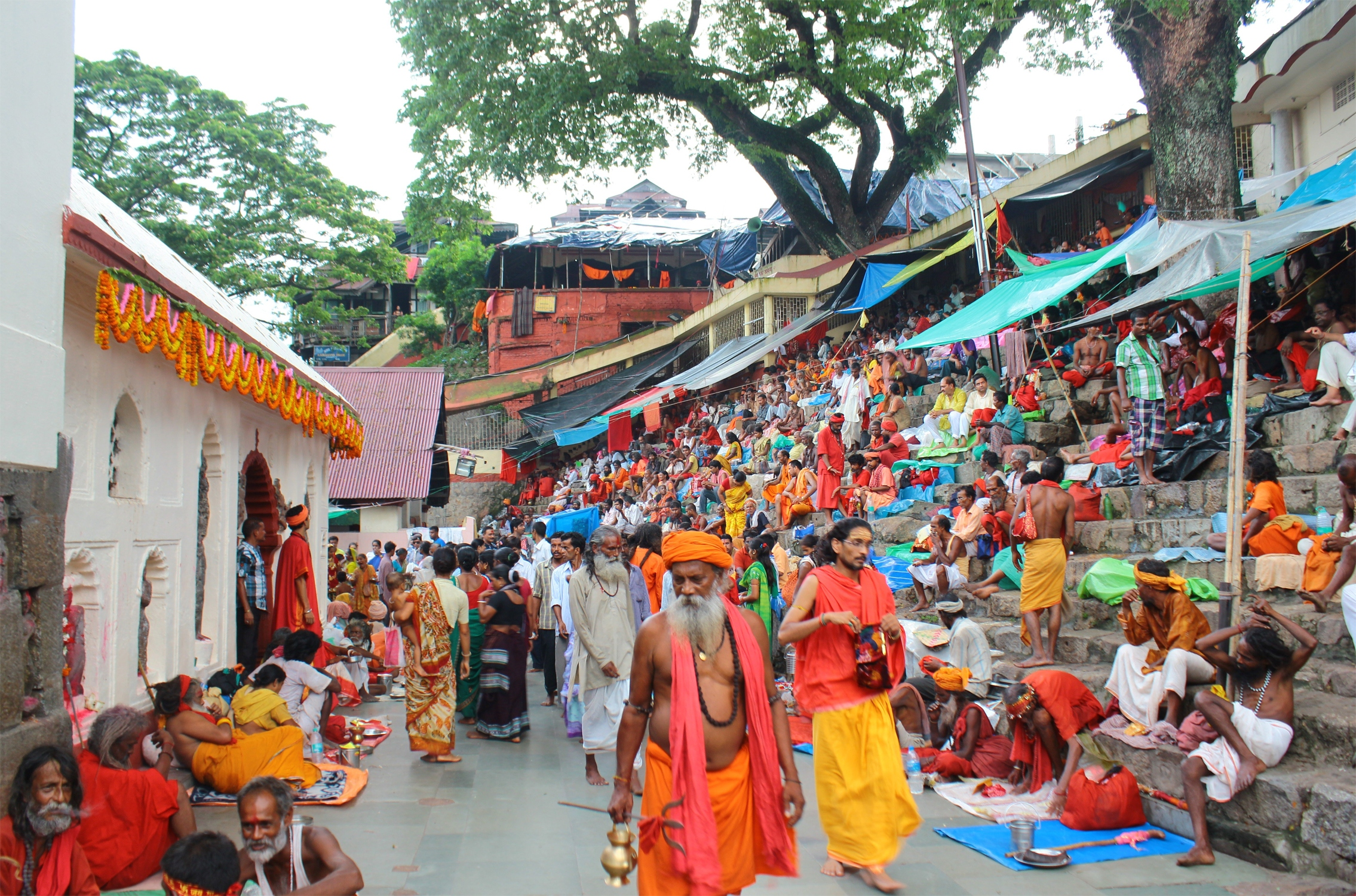
Sadhus gathered at Assam's Kamakhya Temple for the Ambubachi Mela

=== Hinduism ===
Shaiva sadhus are renunciants devoted to Shiva, and Vaishnava sadhus are renouncers devoted to Vishnu (or his avatars, such as Rama or Krishna). The Vaishnava sadhus are sometimes referred to as vairagis. Less numerous are Shakta sadhus, who are devoted to Shakti. Within these general divisions are numerous sects and sub-sects, reflecting different lineages and philosophical schools and traditions often referred to as "sampradayas". Each sampradaya has several "orders" called parampara based on the lineage of the founder of the order. Each sampradaya and parampara may have several monastic and martial akharas.

Within the Shaiva sadhus are many subgroups. Most Shaiva sadhus wear a Tripundra mark on their forehead, dress in saffron, red or orange-coloured clothes, and live a monastic life. Some sadhus such as the Aghori share the practices of ancient Kapalikas, in which they beg with a skull, smear their body with ashes from the cremation ground, and experiment with substances or practices that are generally abhorred by society.

Among the Shaiva sadhus, the Dashanami Sampradaya belong to the Smarta Tradition. They are said to have been formed by the philosopher and renunciant Adi Shankara, believed to have lived in the 8th century CE, though the full history of the sect's formation is not clear. Among them are the Naga subgroups, naked sadhu known for carrying weapons like tridents, swords, canes, and spears. Said to have once functioned as an armed order to protect Hindus from the Mughal rulers, they were involved in a number of military defence campaigns. Generally in the ambit of non-violence at present, some sections are known to practice wrestling and martial arts. Their retreats are still called chhaavni or armed camps (akhara), and mock duels are still sometimes held between them.

Female sadhus (sadhvis) exist in many sects. In many cases, the women that take to the life of renunciation are widows, and these types of sadhvis often live secluded lives in ascetic compounds. Sadhvis are sometimes regarded by some as manifestations or forms of the Goddess, or Devi, and are honoured as such. There have been a number of charismatic sadhvis that have risen to fame as religious teachers in contemporary India, e.g. Anandamayi Ma, Sarada Devi, Mata Amritanandamayi, and Karunamayi.

=== Jainism ===
The Jain community is traditionally discussed in its texts with four terms: sadhu (monks), sadhvi or aryika (nuns), sravaka (laymen householders) and sravika (laywomen householders). As in Hinduism, the Jain householders support the monastic community. The sadhus and sadhvis are intertwined with the Jain lay society, perform murtipuja (Jina idol worship) and lead festive rituals, and they are organized in a strongly hierarchical monastic structure.

There are differences between the Digambara and Śvetāmbara sadhus and sadhvi traditions. The Digambara sadhus own no clothes as a part of their interpretation of Five vows, and they live their ascetic austere lives in nakedness. The Digambara sadhvis wear white clothes. The Śvetāmbara sadhus and sadhvis both wear white clothes. According to a 2009 publication by Harvey J. Sindima, Jain monastic community had 6,000 sadhvis of which less than 100 belong to the Digambara tradition and rest to Śvetāmbara.

== Festive gatherings ==
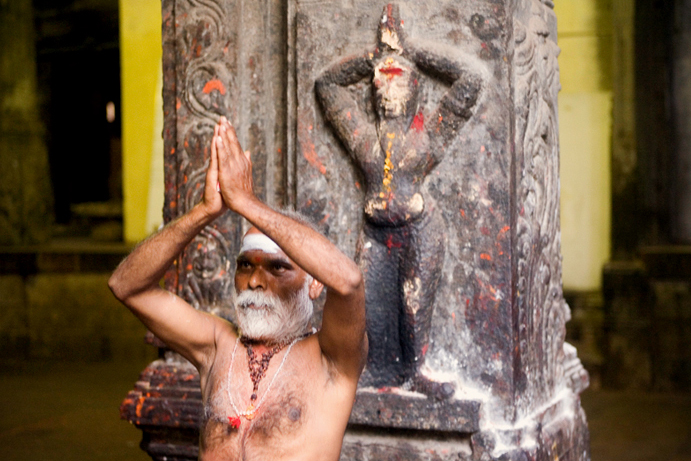
A sadhu in Madurai, India.

Kumbh Mela, a mass gathering of sadhus from all parts of India, takes place every three years at one of four points along sacred rivers throughout India. In 2007, it was held in Nasik, Maharashtra. Peter Owen-Jones filmed one episode of "Extreme Pilgrim" there during this event. It took place again in Haridwar in 2010. Sadhus of all sects join in this reunion. Millions of non-sadhu pilgrims also attend the festivals, and the Kumbh Mela is the largest gathering of human beings for a single religious purpose on the planet. The Kumbh Mela of 2013 started on 14 January of that year at Allahabad. At the festival, sadhus appear in large numbers, including those "completely naked with ash-smeared bodies, [who] sprint into the chilly waters for a dip at the crack of dawn".

== Gallery ==
Sadhu

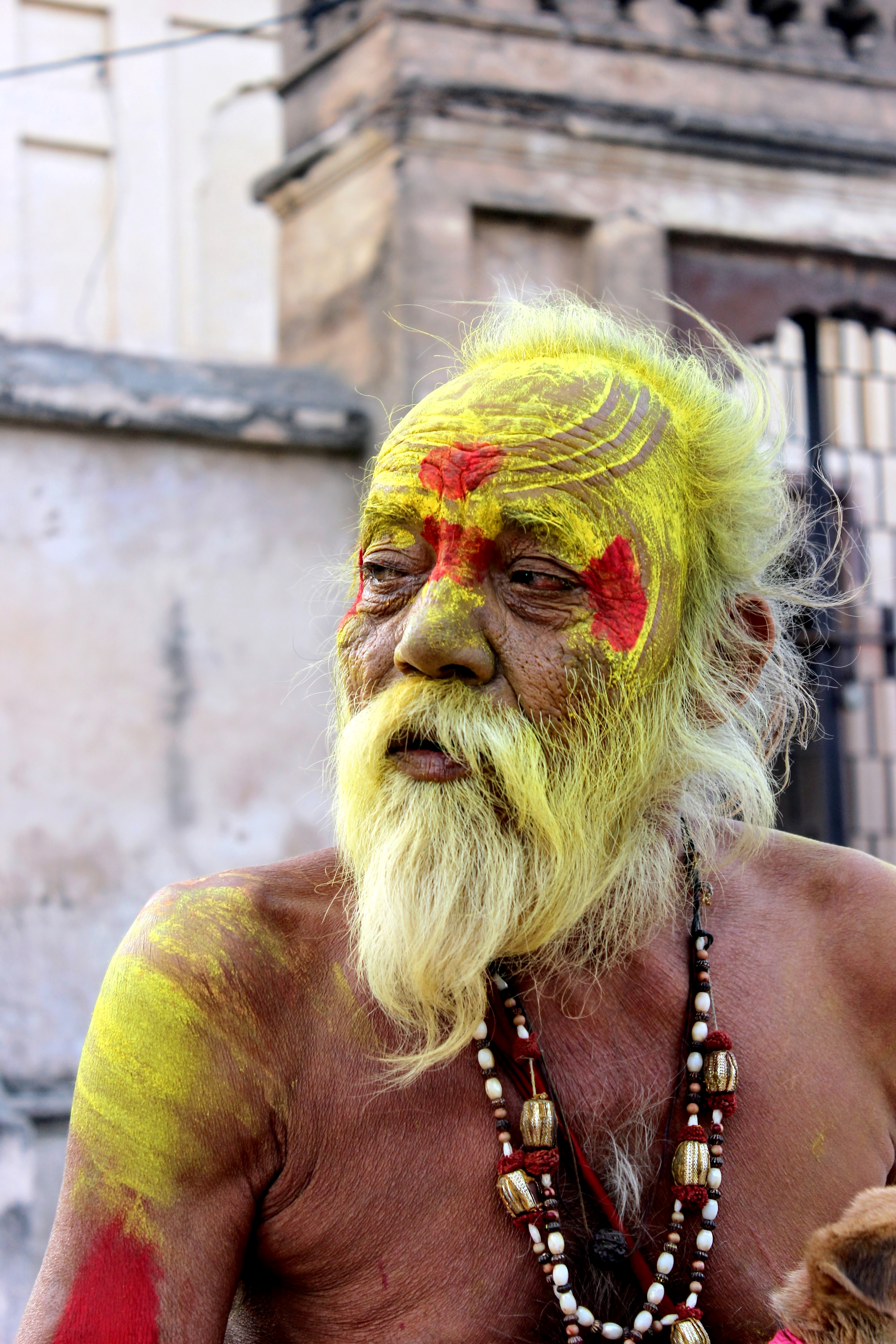
Sadhu in Orchha

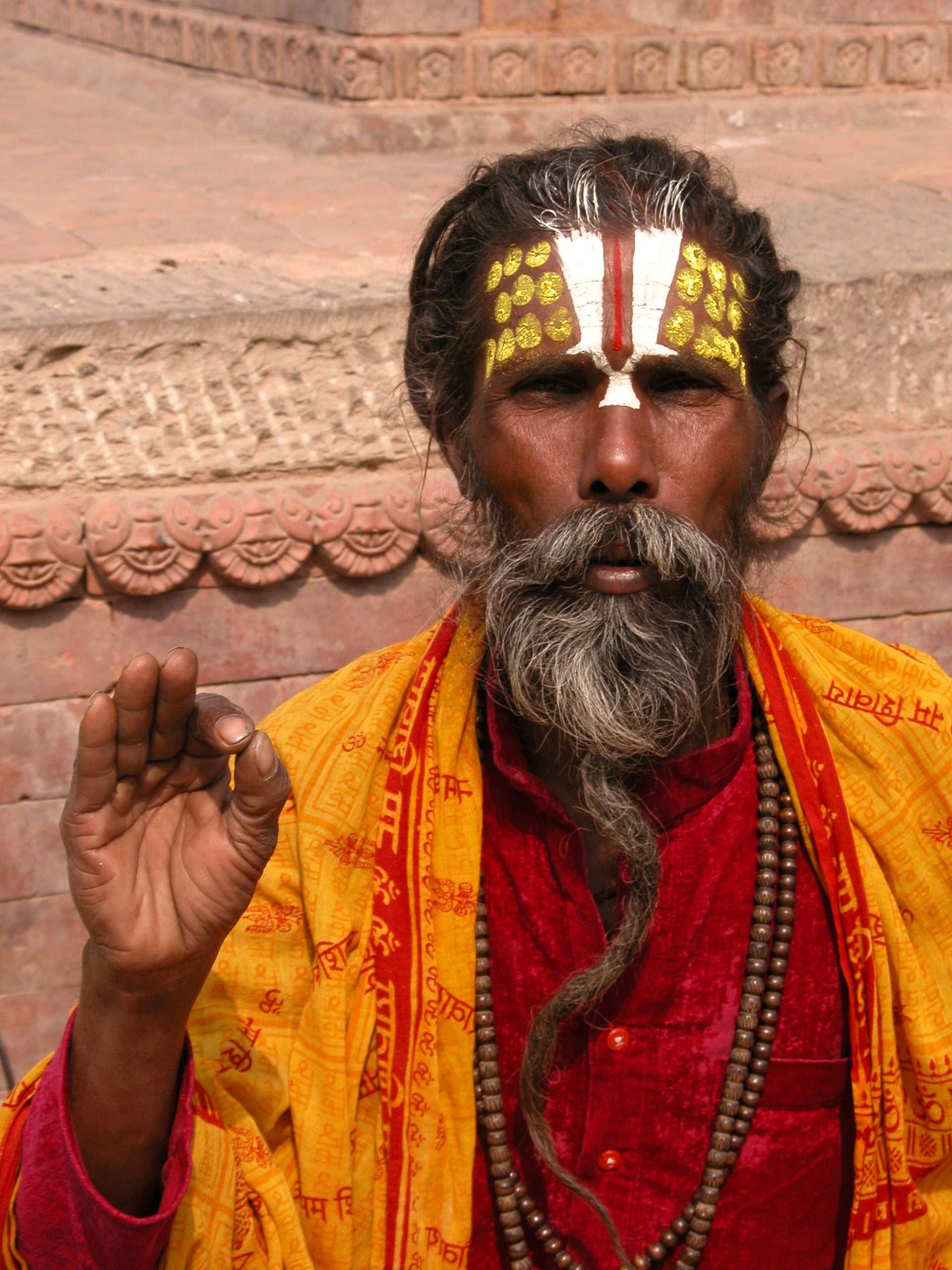
A sadhu in Kathmandu, Nepal

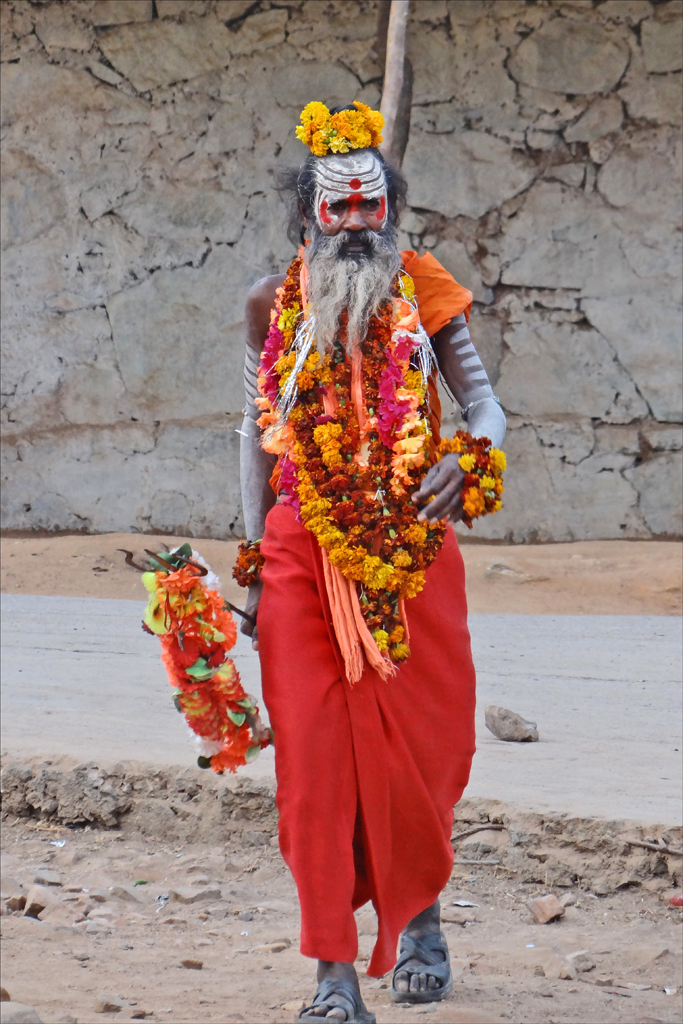
Sadhu in Orchha, Madhya Pradesh

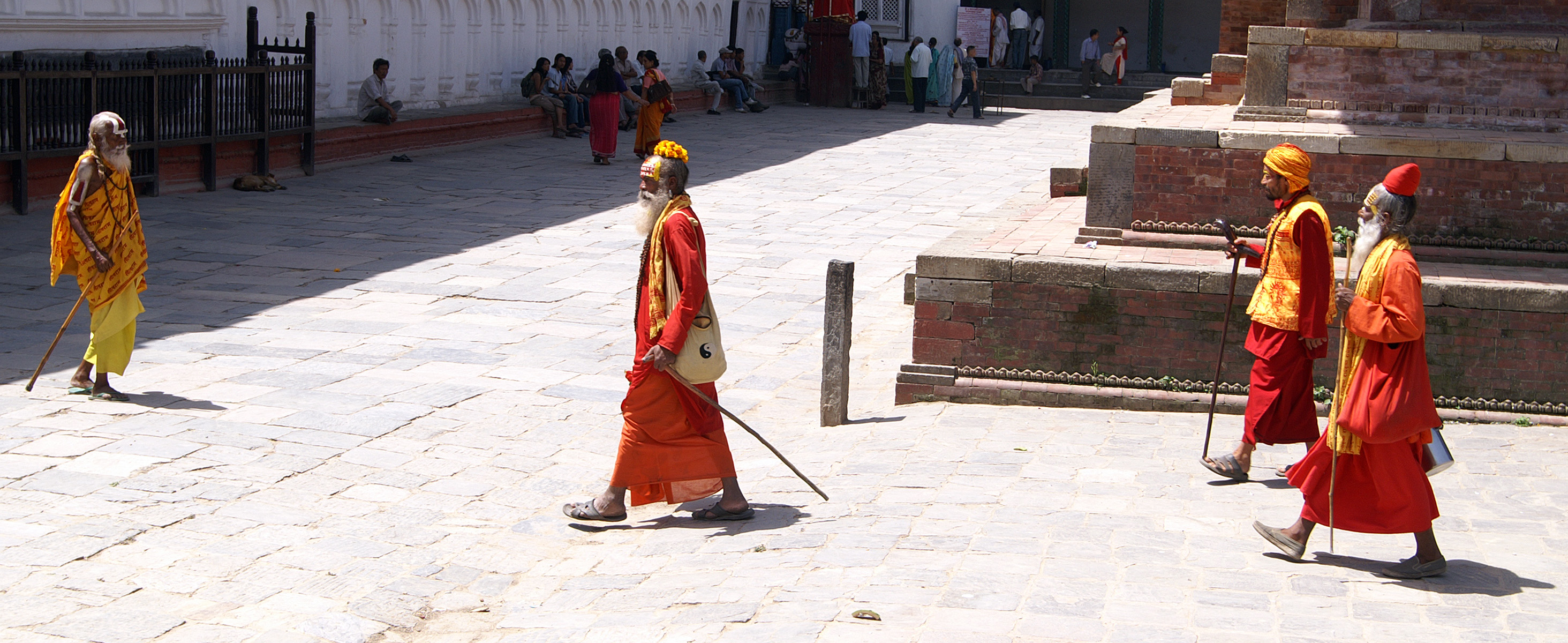
Sadhus walking on Durbar Square, Kathmandu

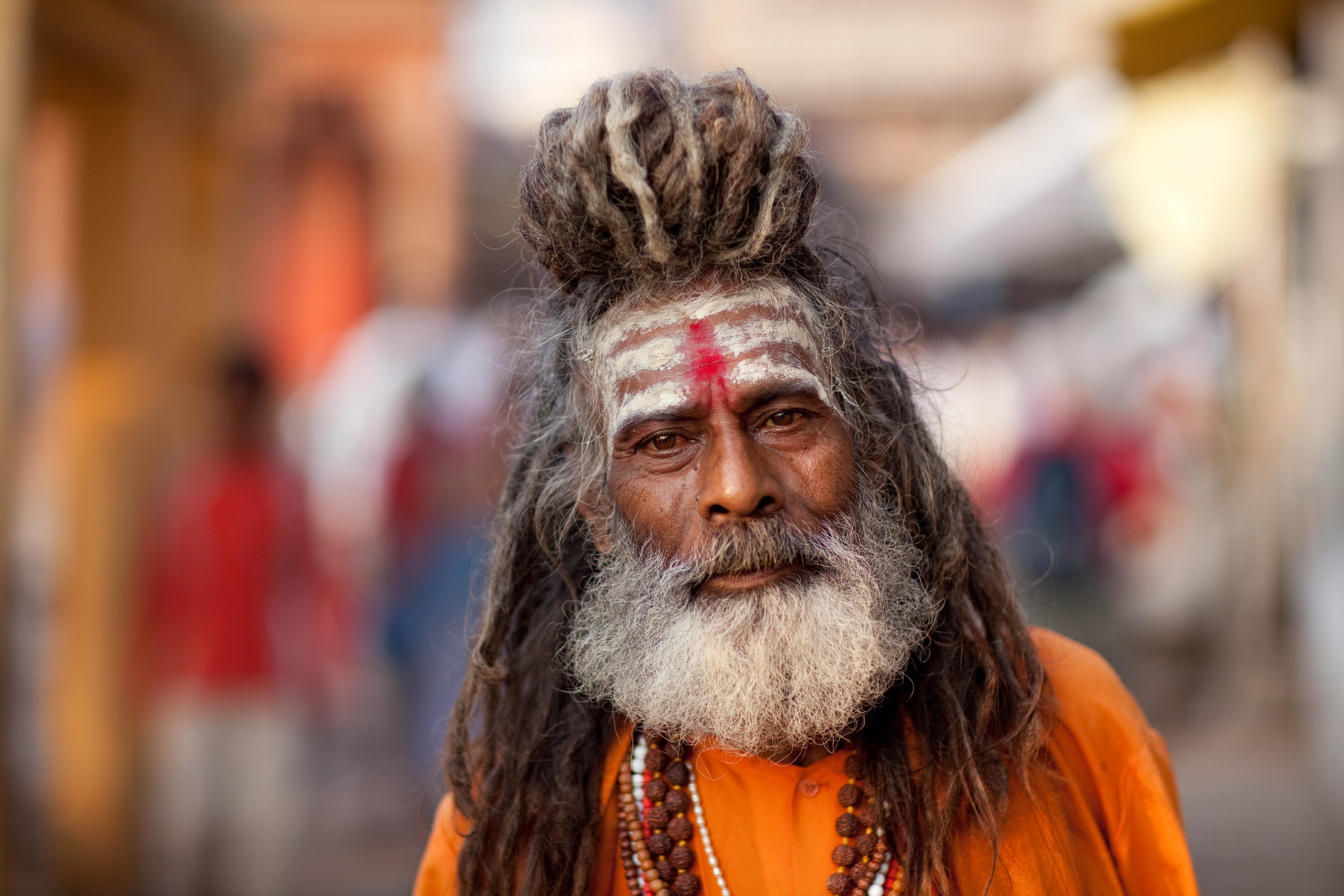
Sadhu from Vārāņsī

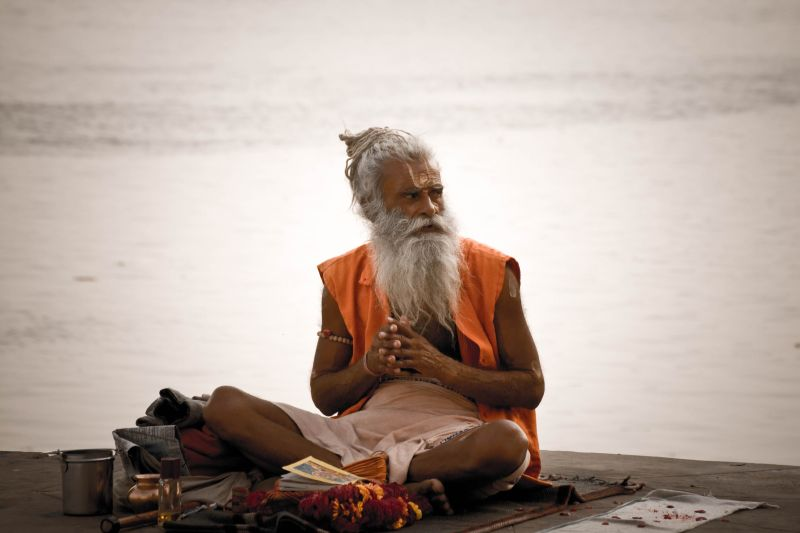
Sadhu by the Ghats on the Ganges

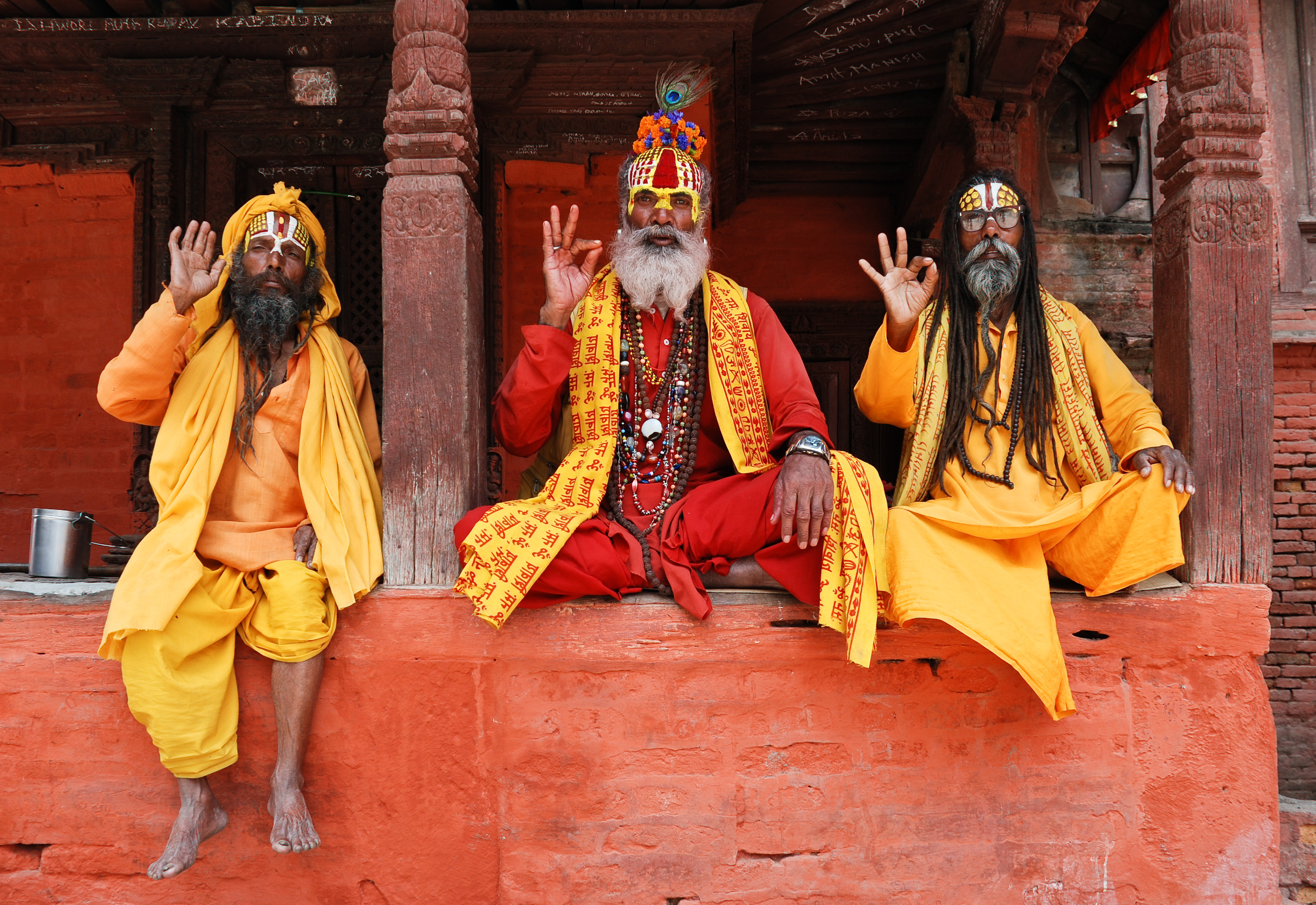
Sadhus at Kathmandu Durbar Square

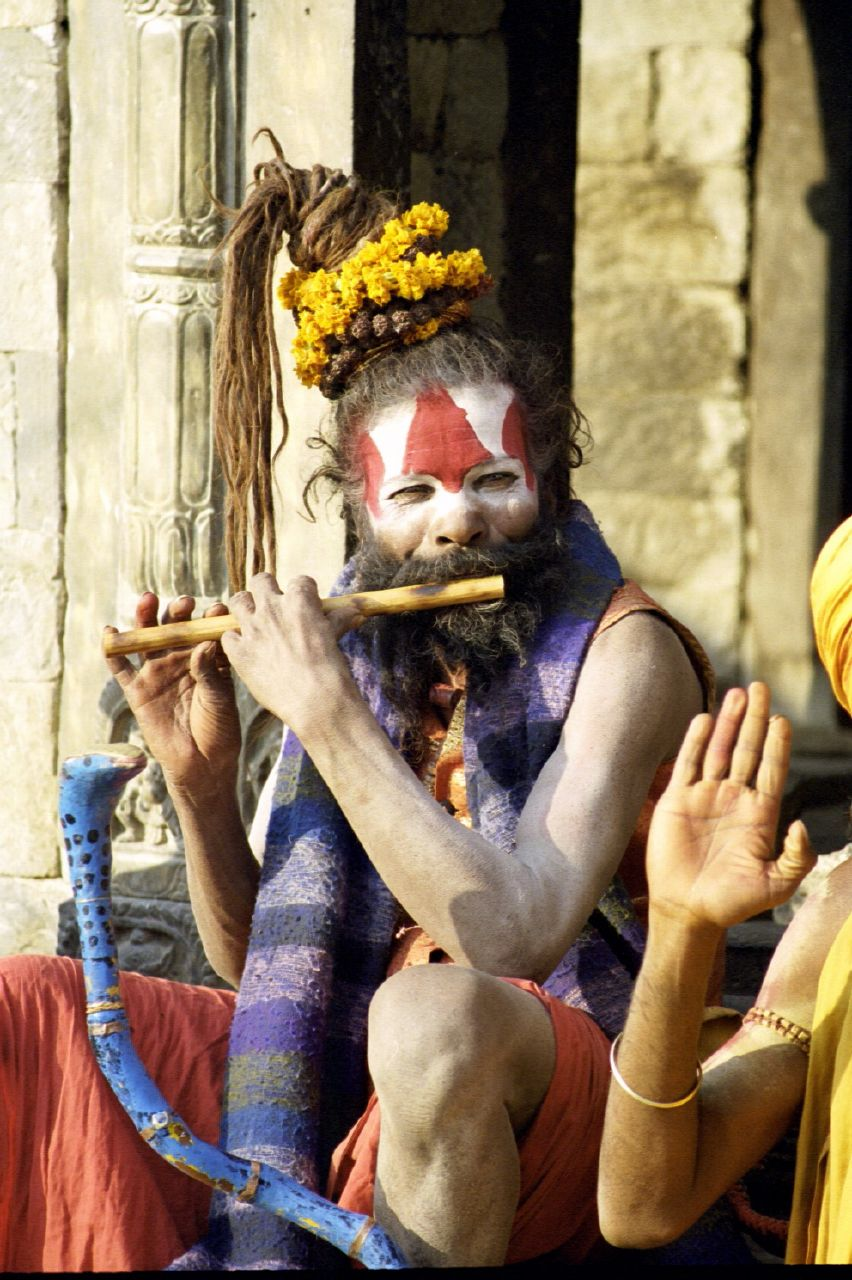
A sadhu playing flute

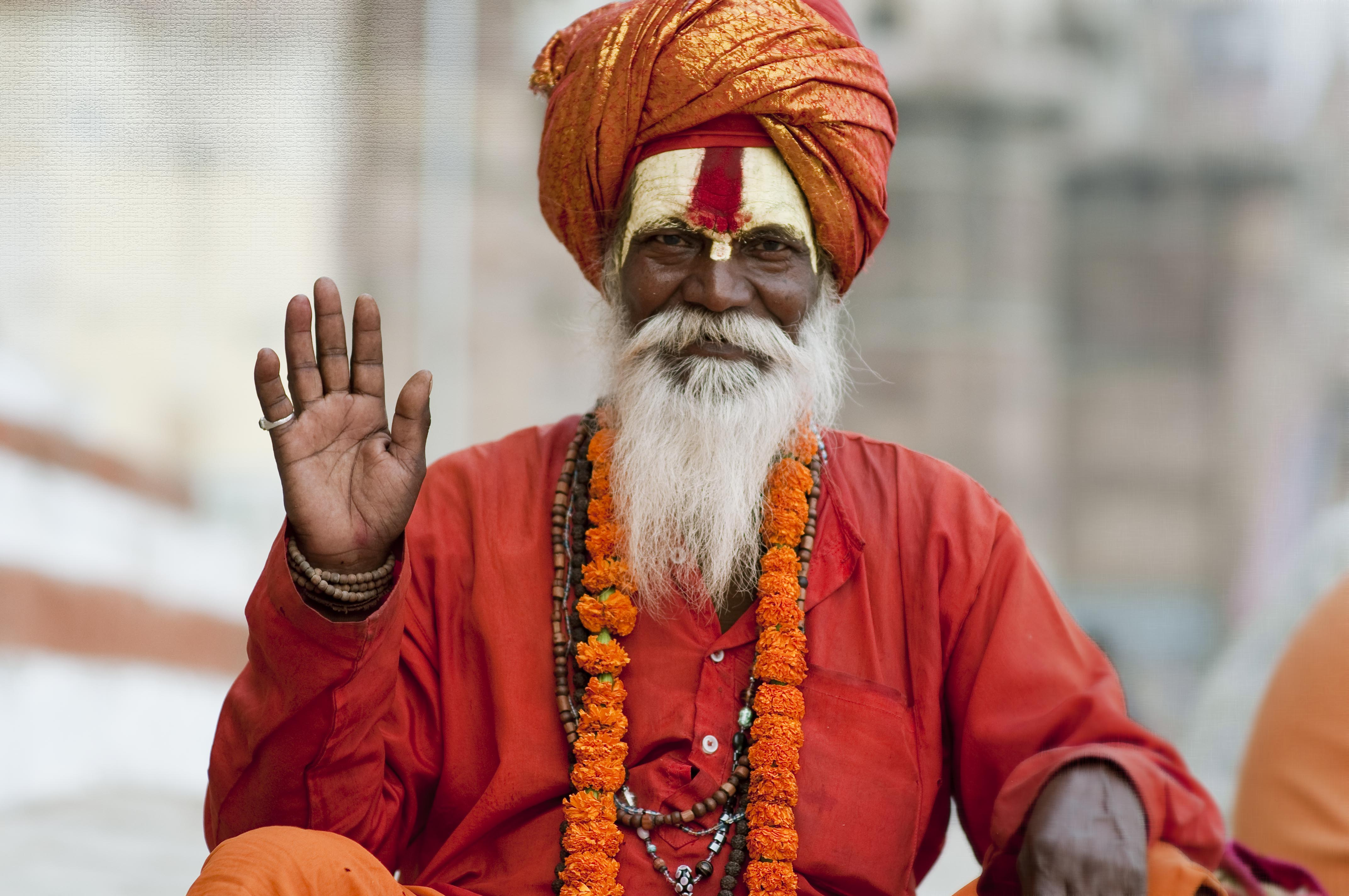
Sadhu in Varanasi, India.

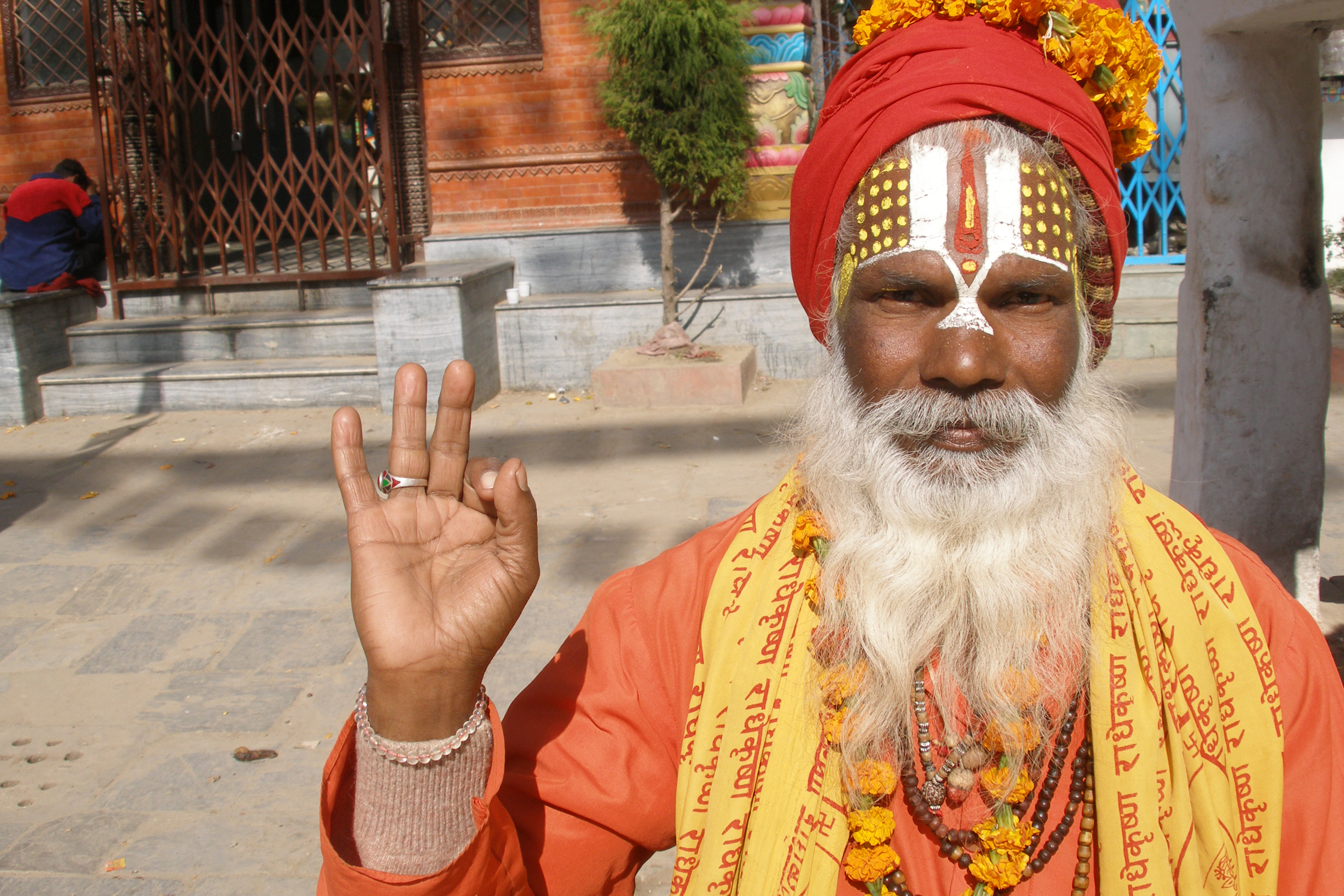
Sadhu at Kaathe Swyambhu, Kathmandu

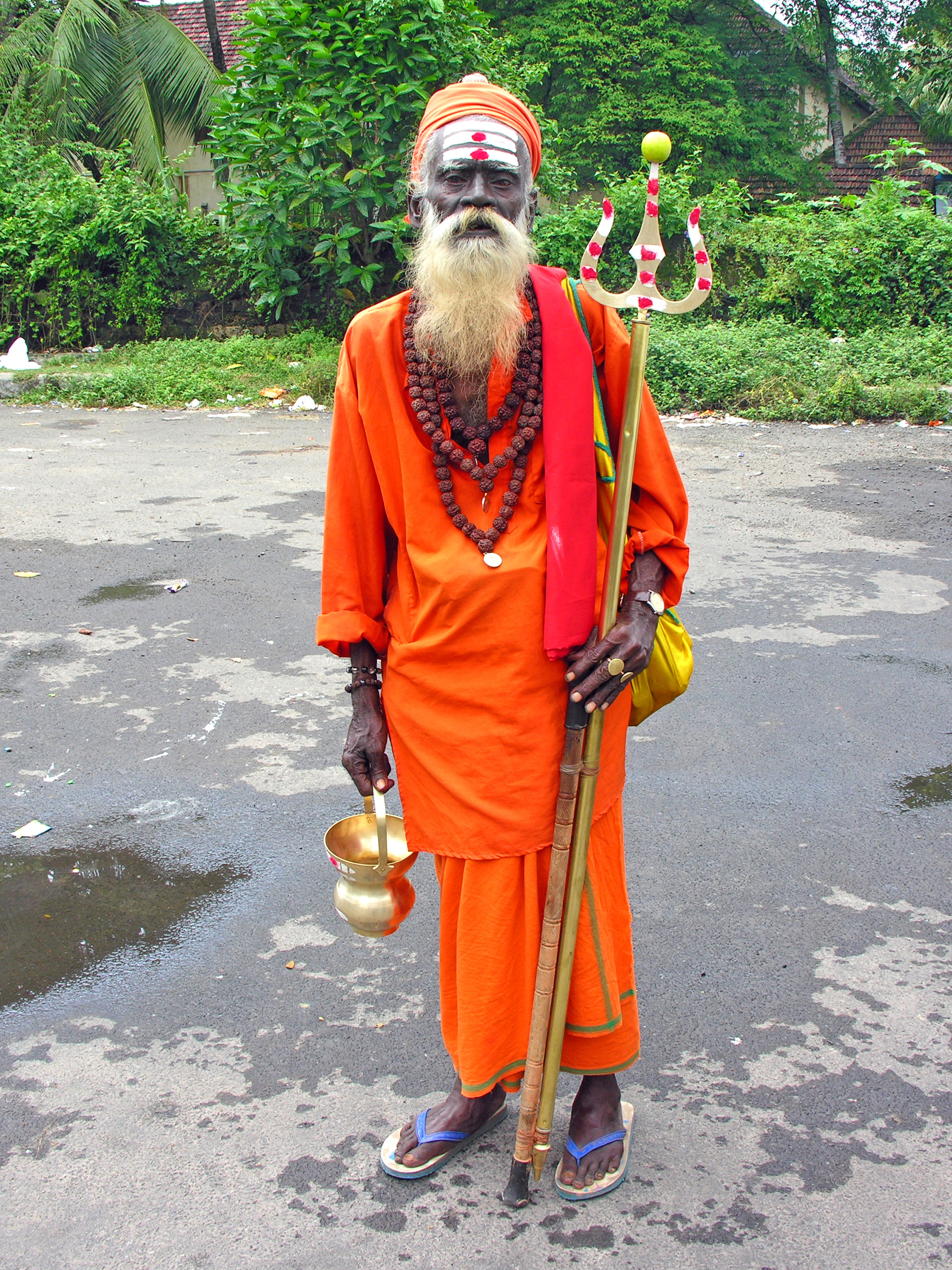
Sadhu in India

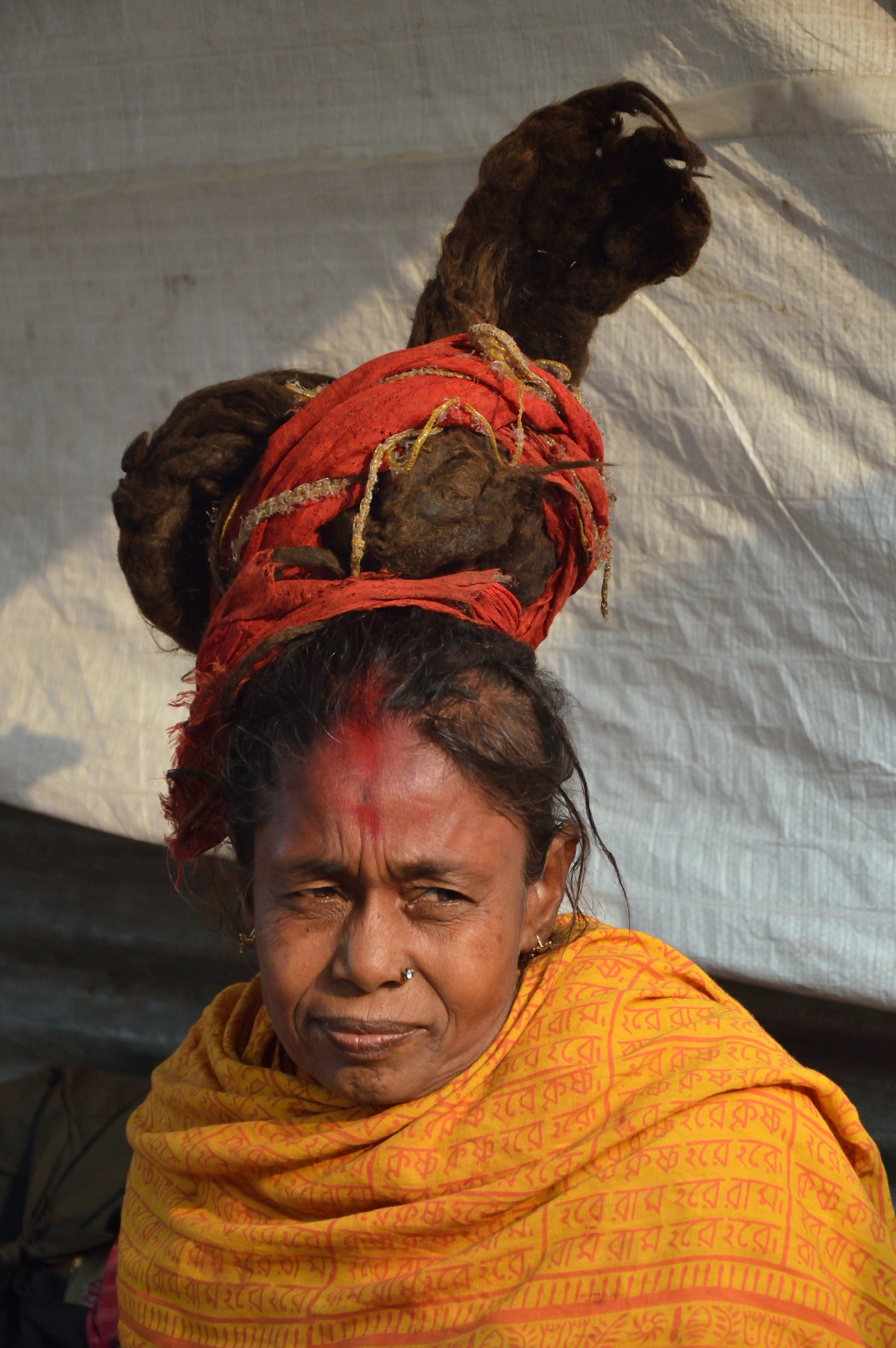
Sadhvi or female Sadhu at the Gangasagar Fair transit camp, Kolkata

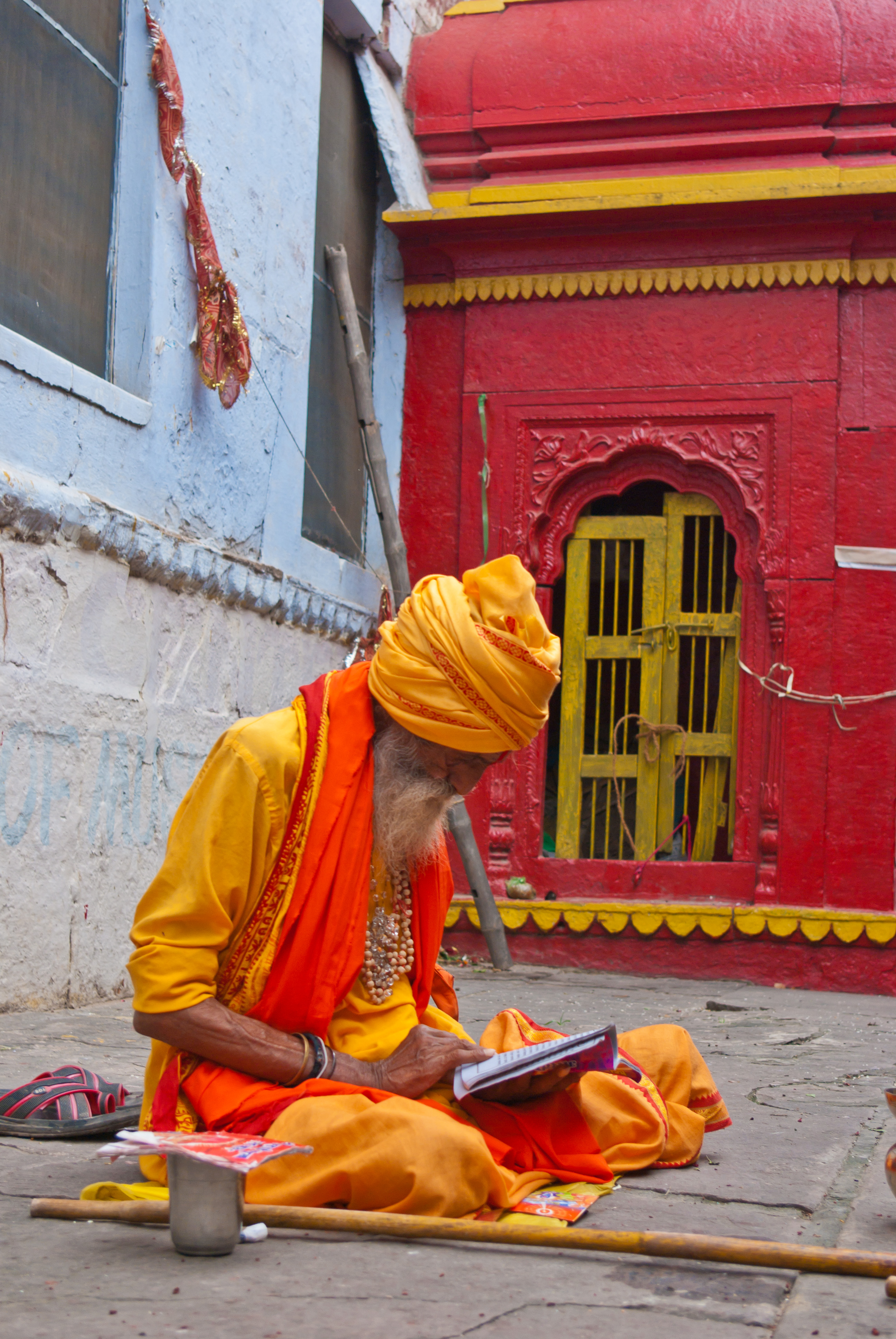
Sadhu at a river bank

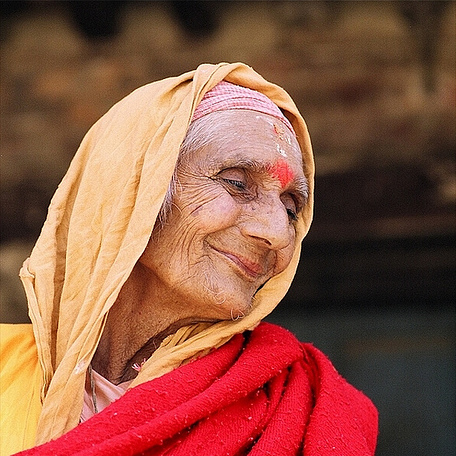
Sadhu in Nepal

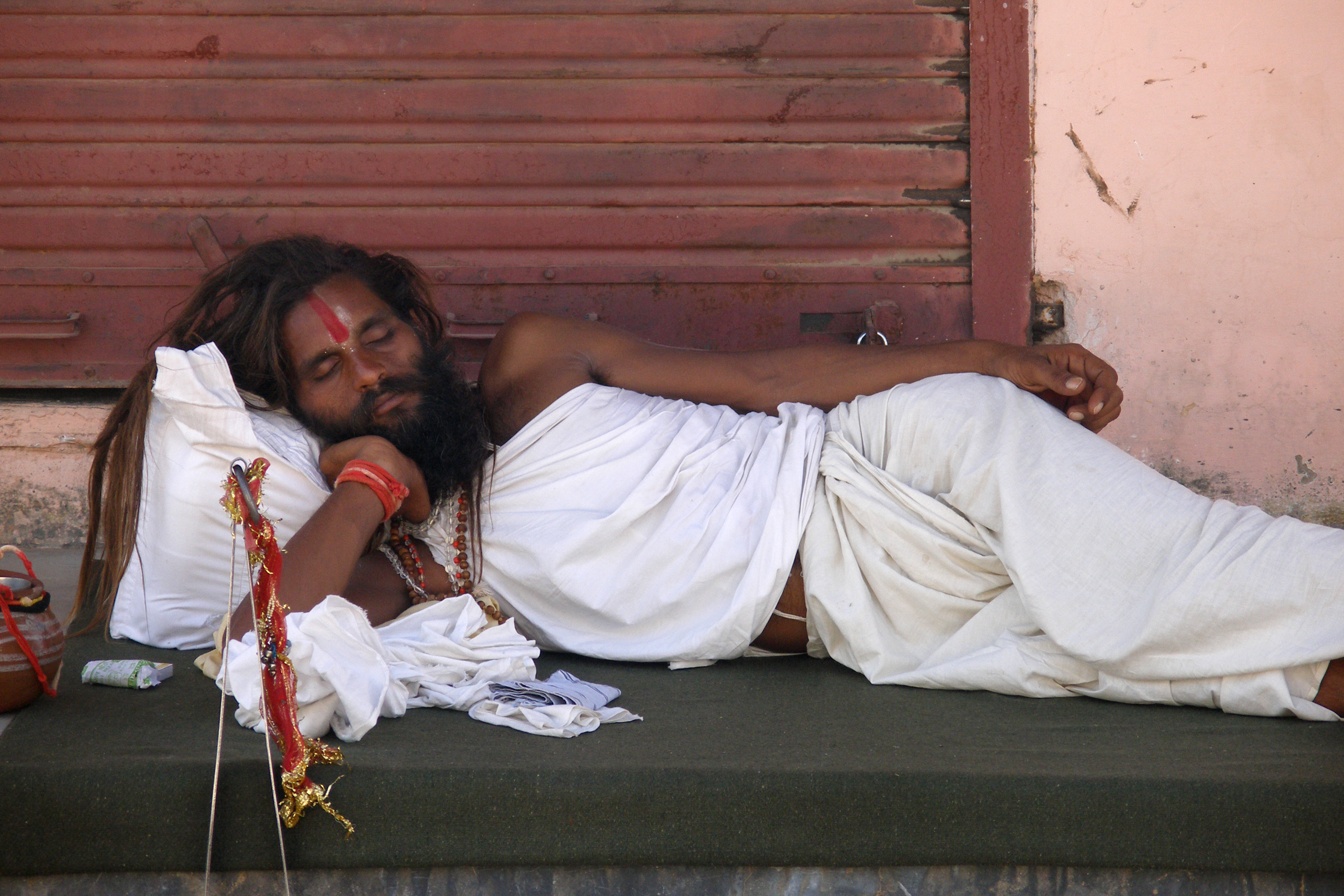
Shiva sadhu in Pushkar, India

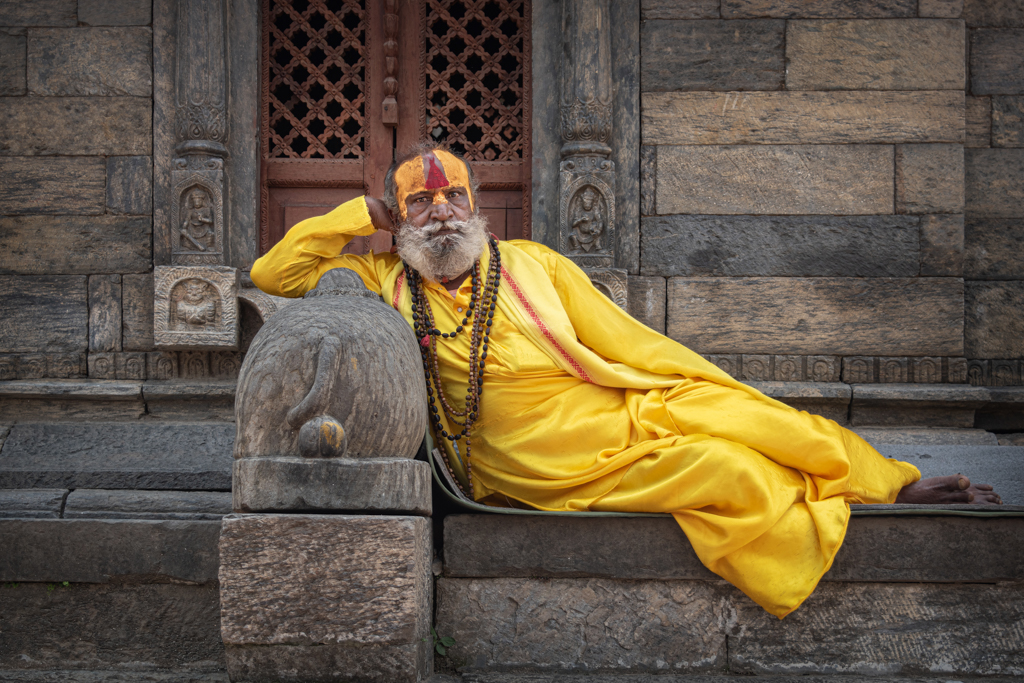
Sadhu in Pashupatinath Temple, Kathmandu, Nepal

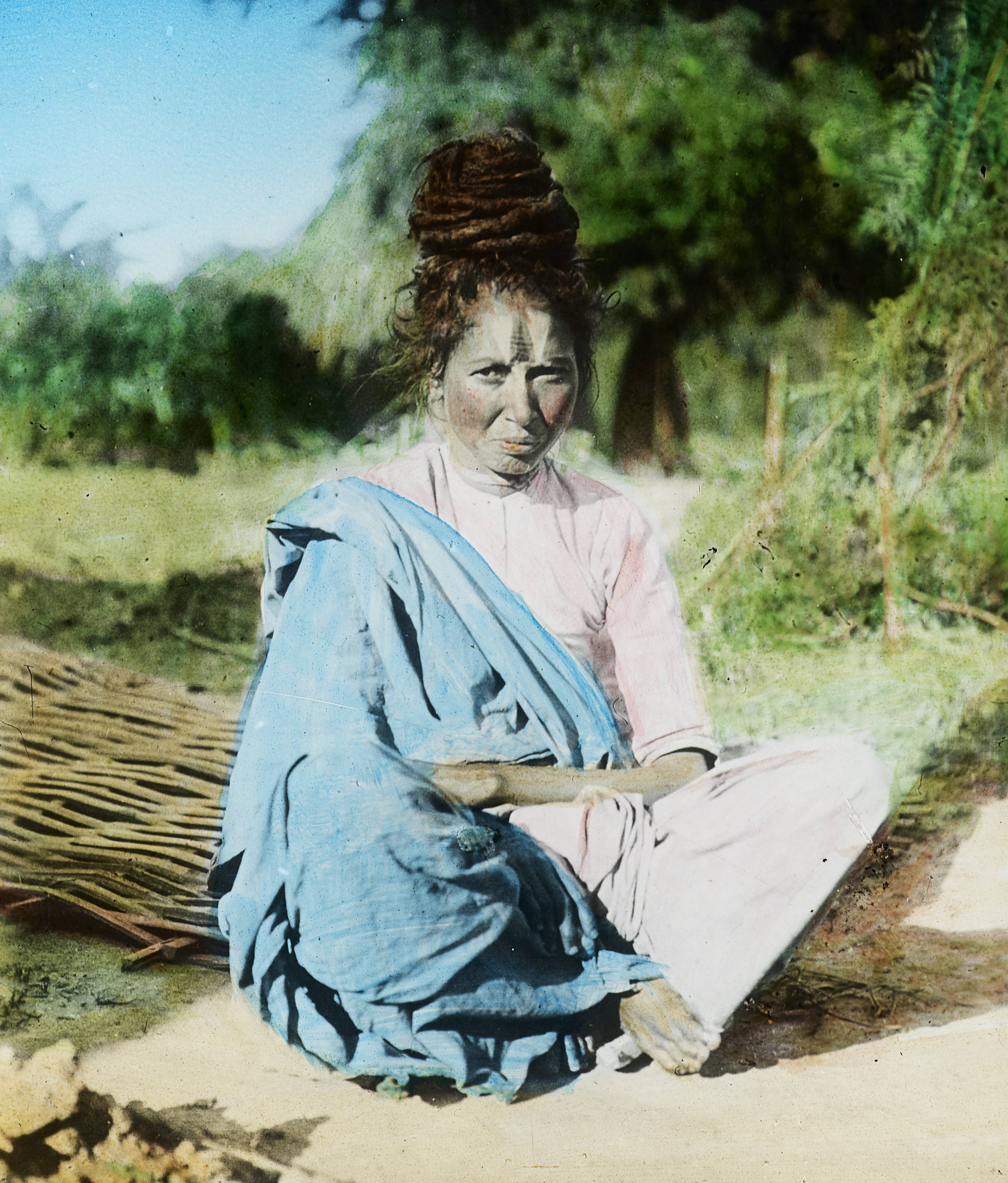
A female sādhvī in Chanpatia, India, 1906.

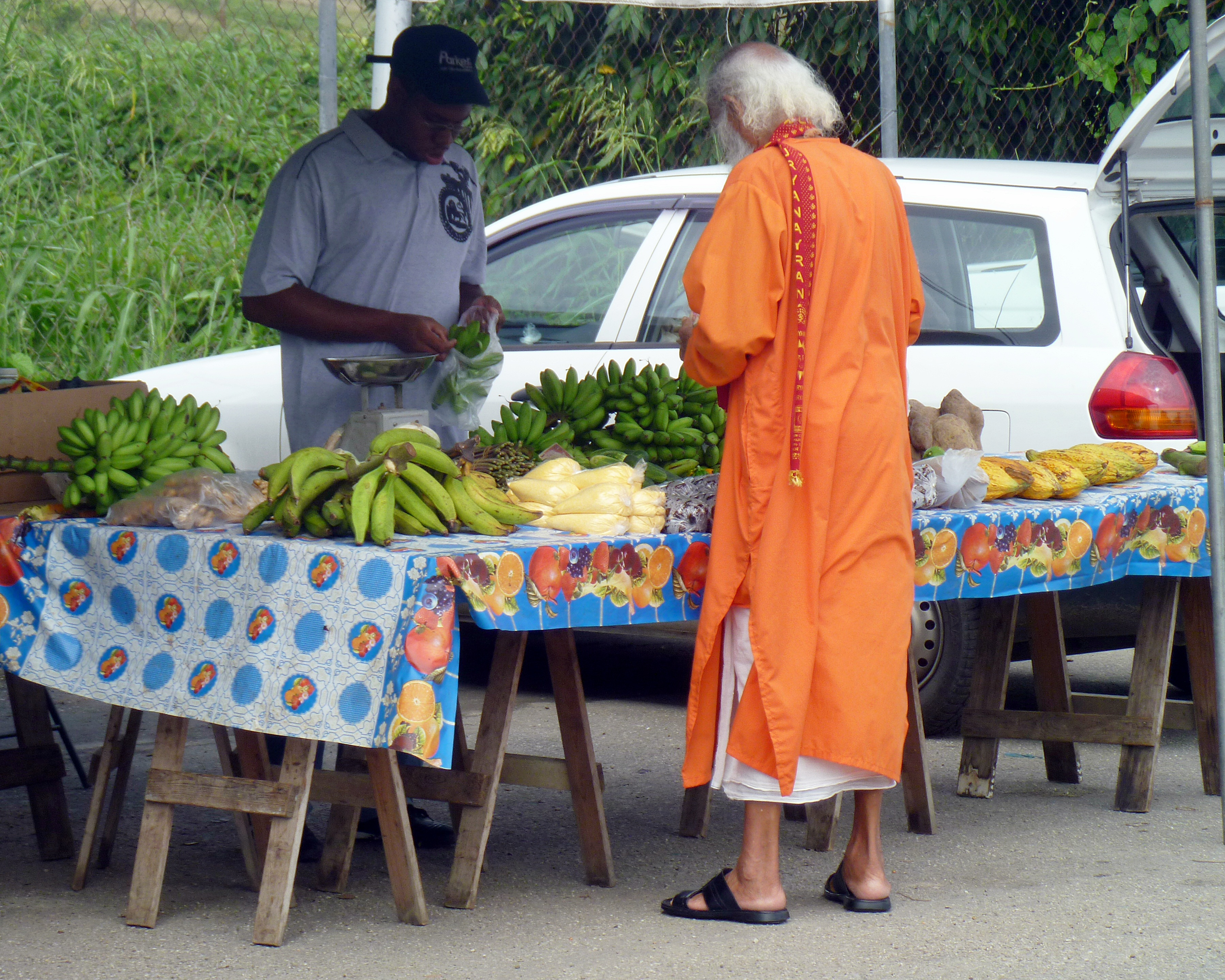
A sadhu at a market in Debe, Trinidad and Tobago

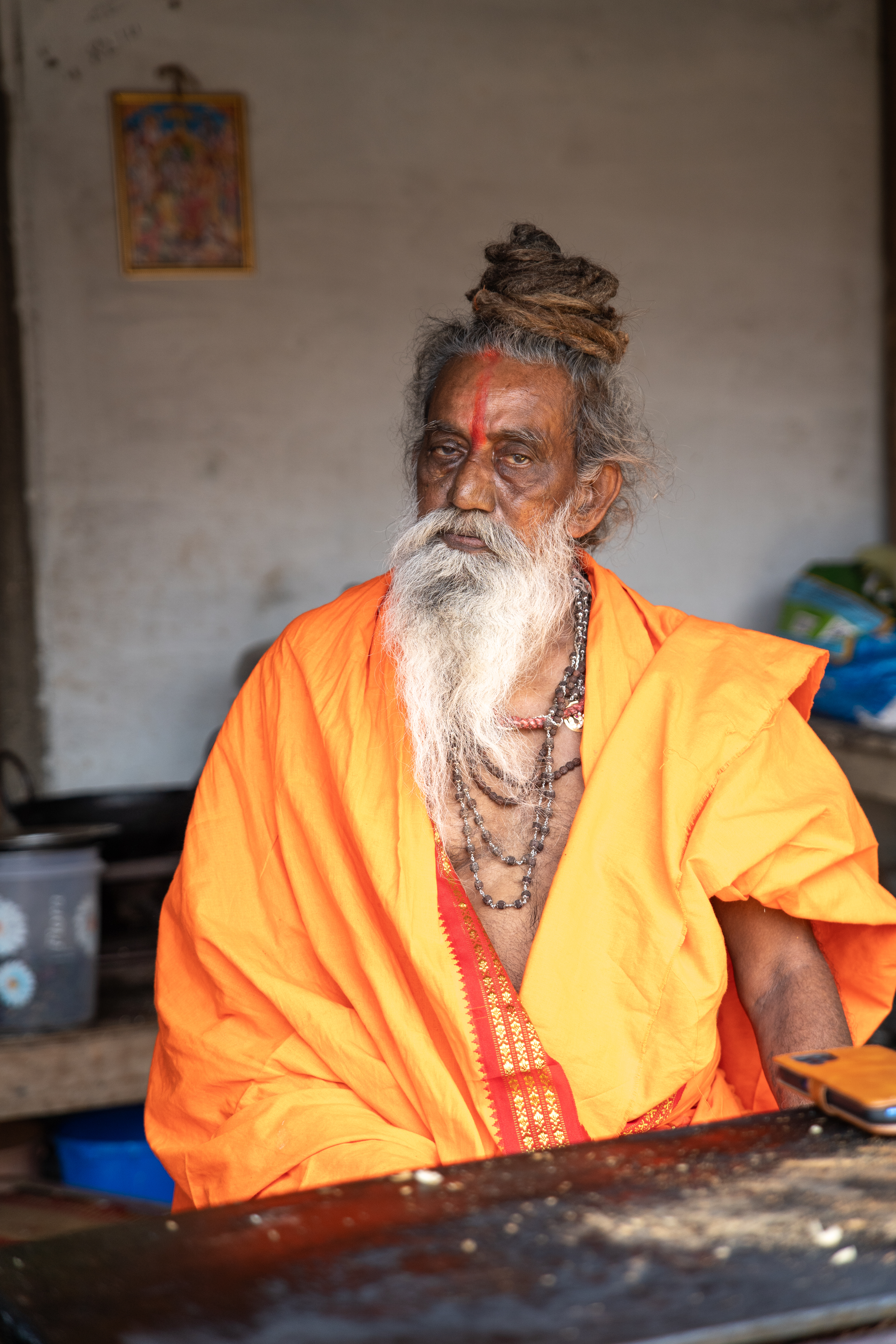
A sadhu at Bhadrachalam on the eve of Ram Navami

== See also ==
- Types
  - Aghori
  - Godman
  - Nath
  - Shramana
- Lineage
  - Guru–shishya tradition
  - Parampara
  - Sampradaya
- Lifestyle
  - Akhara
  - Chillum
  - Kaupinam
  - Kacchera
  - Langota
- Personalities
  - Amar Bharati
