= Rameshwar Nagar railway station =

Railway station in Bihar, India

Rameshwar Nagar

General information
- Location: Sathigaon-Lachhnauta Road, Lachhnauta, West Champaran district, Bihar; India
- Coordinates: 26°58′49″N 84°31′12″E
- Elevation: 78 m (256 ft)
- System: Passenger train station
- Owner: Indian Railways
- Operator: East Central Railway
- Line: Muzaffarpur–Gorakhpur main line
- Platforms: 1
- Tracks: 2

Construction
- Structure type: Standard (on ground station)

Other information
- Status: Active
- Station code: RSWN
- Zone(s): East Central Railway zone
- Division(s): Samastipur

History
- Opened: 1930s

Services
| Preceding station | Indian Railways | Following station |
|---|---|---|
| Sathi towards ? | East Central Railway zone Muzaffarpur–Gorakhpur main line | Chanpatia towards ? |
Location

Rameshwar Nagar railway station (station code: RSWN) is a halt railway station on Muzaffarpur–Gorakhpur main line under the Samastipur railway division of East Central Railway zone. This is situated beside Sathigaon-Lachhnauta Road at Lachhnauta in West Champaran district of the Indian state of Bihar.
