= Sathi railway station =

Railway station in Bihar, India

Sathi

General information
- Location: Sathi Bazar Main Road, Paroraha, Sathi, West Champaran district, Bihar; India
- Coordinates: 27°00′57″N 84°30′14″E
- Elevation: 84 m (276 ft)
- System: Passenger train station
- Owner: Indian Railways
- Operator: East Central Railway
- Line: Muzaffarpur–Gorakhpur main line
- Platforms: 2
- Tracks: 2

Construction
- Structure type: Standard (on ground station)

Other information
- Status: Active
- Station code: SAHI
- Zone(s): East Central Railway zone
- Division(s): Samastipur

History
- Opened: 1930s

Services
Preceding station	Indian Railways	Following station
Musharwa Halt towards ?	East Central Railway zone Muzaffarpur–Gorakhpur main line	Rameshwar Nagar towards ?
Location

Sathi railway station (station code: SAHI), is a railway station on Muzaffarpur–Gorakhpur main line under the Samastipur railway division of East Central Railway zone. This is situated beside Sathi Bazar Main Road at Paroraha, Sathi in West Champaran district of the Indian state of Bihar.
