= Prajapati Halt railway station =

Railway station in Bihar, India

Prajapati Halt

General information
- Location: Bagaha Dhala Road, Chawani, Bettiah, West Champaran district, Bihar; India
- Coordinates: 26°48′57″N 84°30′08″E
- Elevation: 78 m (256 ft)
- System: Passenger train station
- Owner: Indian Railways
- Operator: East Central Railway
- Line: Muzaffarpur–Gorakhpur main line
- Platforms: 2
- Tracks: 2

Construction
- Structure type: Standard (on ground station)

Other information
- Status: Active
- Station code: PJPT
- Zone(s): East Central Railway zone
- Division(s): Samastipur

History
- Opened: 1930s

Services
Preceding station	Indian Railways	Following station
Kumarbagh towards ?	East Central Railway zone Muzaffarpur–Gorakhpur main line	Bettiah towards ?
Location

Prajapati Halt railway station (station code: PJPT), is a railway station on Muzaffarpur–Gorakhpur main line under the Samastipur railway division of East Central Railway zone. This is situated beside Bagaha Dhala Road at Chawani, Bettiah in West Champaran district of the Indian state of Bihar.
