= Musharwa Halt railway station =

Railway station in Bihar, India

Musharwa Halt

General information
- Location: Bettiah-Narkatiaganj Road, Musharwa, West Champaran district, Bihar; India
- Coordinates: 27°03′06″N 84°29′13″E
- Elevation: 82 m (269 ft)
- System: Passenger train station
- Owner: Indian Railways
- Operator: East Central Railway
- Line: Muzaffarpur–Gorakhpur main line
- Platforms: 1
- Tracks: 2

Construction
- Structure type: Standard (on ground station)

Other information
- Status: Active
- Station code: MSHW
- Zone(s): East Central Railway zone
- Division(s): Samastipur

History
- Opened: 1930s

Services
Preceding station	Indian Railways	Following station
Narkatiaganj Junction towards ?	East Central Railway zone Muzaffarpur–Gorakhpur main line	Sathi towards ?
Location

Musharwa Halt railway station (station code: MSHW), is a halt railway station on Muzaffarpur–Gorakhpur main line under the Samastipur railway division of East Central Railway zone. This is situated beside Bettiah-Narkatiaganj Road at Musharwa in West Champaran district of the Indian state of Bihar.
