= Kumarbagh railway station =

Railway station in Bihar, India

Kumarbagh

General information
- Location: Bettiah-Narkatiaganj Road, Kurwa Mathia, Kumarbagh, West Champaran district, Bihar; India
- Coordinates: 26°52′28″N 84°30′42″E
- Elevation: 81 m (266 ft)
- System: Passenger train station
- Owner: Indian Railways
- Operator: East Central Railway
- Line: Muzaffarpur–Gorakhpur main line
- Platforms: 2
- Tracks: 2

Construction
- Structure type: Standard (on ground station)

Other information
- Status: Active
- Station code: KUMB
- Zone(s): East Central Railway zone
- Division(s): Samastipur

History
- Opened: 1930s

Services
Preceding station	Indian Railways	Following station
Chanpatia towards ?	East Central Railway zone Muzaffarpur–Gorakhpur main line	Prajapati Halt towards ?
Location

Kumarbagh railway station (station code: KUMB), is a railway station on Muzaffarpur–Gorakhpur main line under the Samastipur railway division of East Central Railway zone. This is situated beside Bettiah-Narkatiaganj Road at Kurwa Mathia, Kumarbagh in West Champaran district of the Indian state of Bihar.
