= Amar Bharati =

Indian religious figure

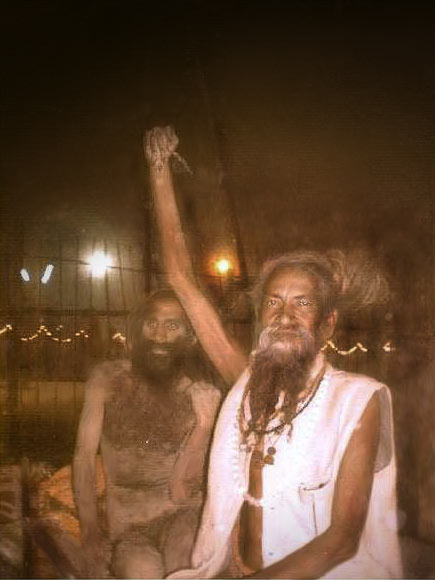
Amar Bharati at the Kumbha Mela in 2001, having raised his arm for 28 years as of the time being photographed.

Amar Bharati is an Indian Sadhu or ascetic who is known for claiming to have kept his right arm raised for years in a testament of his devotion to the Hindu deity Shiva, and as a call for world peace.

== Description ==
Bharati worked as a clerk in New Delhi until he quit his job and left his family and friends in 1970 in order to develop his devotion to Shiva, one of the principal deities of Hinduism. After quitting his job, he felt like he was still connected to his old life and raised his arm starting in 1973 as a sign of his devotion and "to militate against wars and support world peace". He spent two years of his life in severe pain by doing this, but later lost all sensation in his arm. The muscles in his arm atrophied during this time. Many of his followers have taken inspiration from his actions, calling it a "beacon of hope" and even raising their own arms for years.

There is a fakir in the novel The Mystery of the Black Jungle by Emilio Salgari who does the same practice.
