= Muscle atrophy =

Loss of skeletal muscle mass

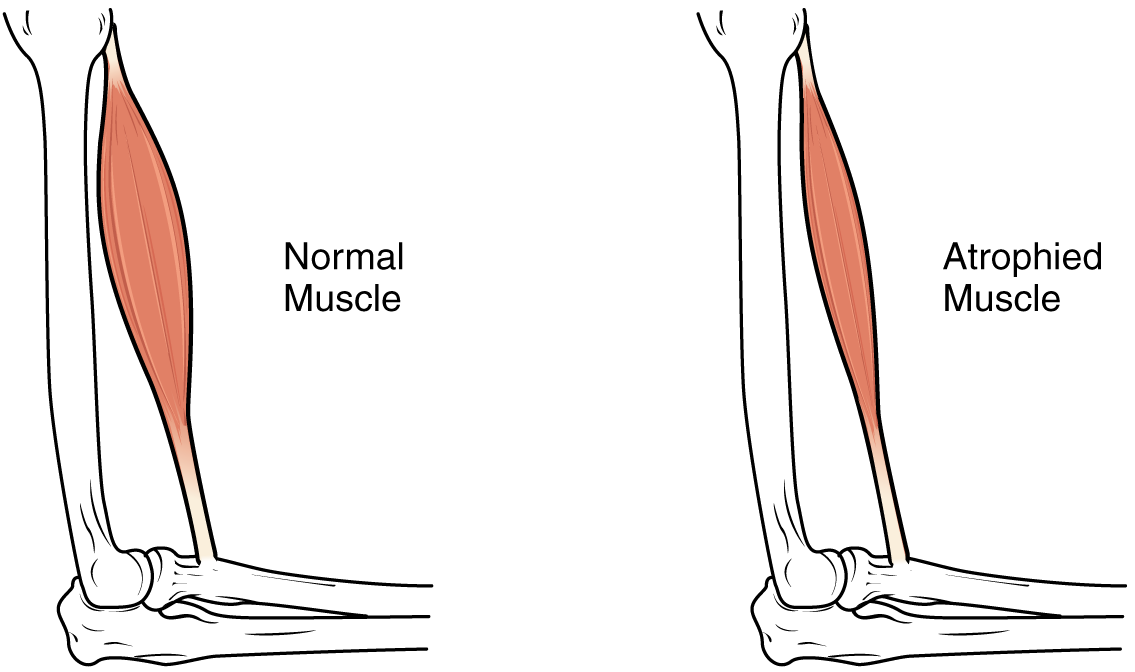
- The size of the muscle is reduced, as a consequence there is a loss of strength and mobility.
- Specialty: Physical medicine and rehabilitation

Muscle atrophy is the loss of skeletal muscle mass. It can be caused by immobility, aging, malnutrition, medications, or a wide range of injuries or diseases that impact the musculoskeletal or nervous system. Muscle atrophy leads to muscle weakness and causes disability.

Disuse causes rapid muscle atrophy and often occurs during injury or illness that requires immobilization of a limb or bed rest. Depending on the duration of disuse and the health of the individual, this may be fully reversed with activity. Malnutrition first causes fat loss but may progress to muscle atrophy in prolonged starvation and can be reversed with nutritional therapy. In contrast, cachexia is a wasting syndrome caused by an underlying disease such as cancer that causes dramatic muscle atrophy and cannot be completely reversed with nutritional therapy. Sarcopenia is age-related muscle atrophy and can be slowed by exercise. Finally, diseases of the muscles such as muscular dystrophy or myopathies can cause atrophy, as well as damage to the nervous system such as in spinal cord injury or stroke. Thus, muscle atrophy is usually a finding (sign or symptom) in a disease rather than being a disease by itself. However, some syndromes of muscular atrophy are classified as disease spectrums or disease entities rather than as clinical syndromes alone, such as the various spinal muscular atrophies.

Muscle atrophy results from an imbalance between protein synthesis and protein degradation, although the mechanisms are incompletely understood and are variable depending on the cause. Muscle loss can be quantified with advanced imaging studies but this is not frequently pursued. Treatment depends on the underlying cause but will often include exercise and adequate nutrition. Anabolic agents may have some efficacy but are not often used due to side effects. There are multiple treatments and supplements under investigation but there are currently limited treatment options in clinical practice. Given the implications of muscle atrophy and limited treatment options, minimizing immobility is critical in injury or illness.

== Signs and symptoms ==
The hallmark sign of muscle atrophy is loss of lean muscle mass. This change may be difficult to detect due to obesity, changes in fat mass or edema. Changes in weight, limb or waist circumference are not reliable indicators of muscle mass changes.

The predominant symptom is increased weakness which may result in difficulty or inability in performing physical tasks depending on what muscles are affected. Atrophy of the core or leg muscles may cause difficulty standing from a seated position, walking or climbing stairs and can cause increased falls. Atrophy of the throat muscles may cause difficulty swallowing and diaphragm atrophy can cause difficulty breathing. Muscle atrophy can be asymptomatic and may go undetected until a significant amount of muscle is lost.

== Causes ==
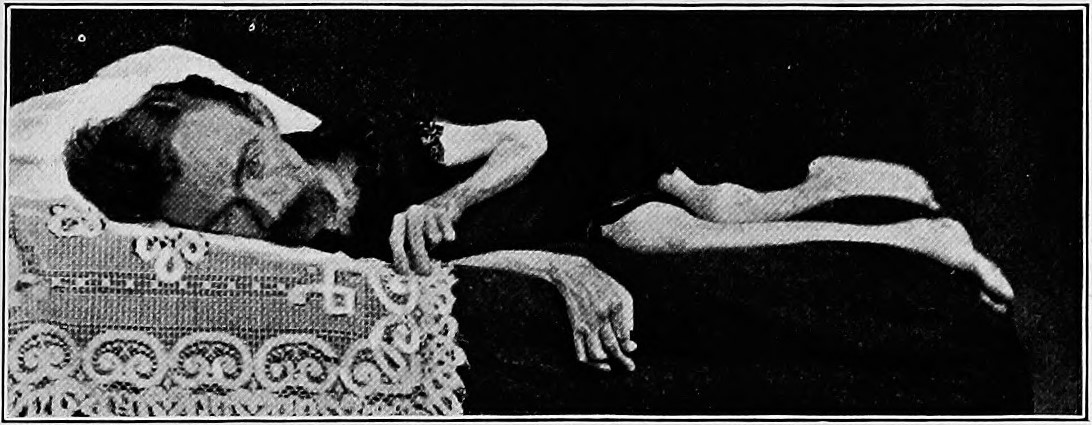
Muscle atrophy from "nondevelopment"

Skeletal muscle serves as a storage site for amino acids, creatine, myoglobin, and adenosine triphosphate, which can be used for energy production when demands are high or supplies are low. If metabolic demands remain greater than protein synthesis, muscle mass is lost. Many diseases and conditions can lead to this imbalance, either through the disease itself or disease associated appetite-changes, such as loss of taste due to COVID-19. Causes of muscle atrophy, include immobility, aging, malnutrition, certain systemic diseases (cancer, congestive heart failure; chronic obstructive pulmonary disease; AIDS, liver disease, etc.), deinnervation, intrinsic muscle disease or medications (such as glucocorticoids).

=== Immobility ===
Disuse is a common cause of muscle atrophy and can be local (due to injury or casting) or general (bed-rest). The rate of muscle atrophy from disuse (10–42 days) is approximately 0.5–0.6% of total muscle mass per day although there is considerable variation between people. The elderly are the most vulnerable to dramatic muscle loss with immobility. Much of the established research has investigated prolonged disuse (>10 days), in which the muscle is compromised primarily by declines in muscle protein synthesis rates rather than changes in muscle protein breakdown. There is evidence to suggest that there may be more active protein breakdown during short term immobility (<10 days). Research has shown that immobilization induces anabolic resistance in skeletal muscle, reducing its responsiveness to anabolic stimuli such as insulin and β₂-adrenoceptor agonists like salbutamol.

=== Cachexia ===
Certain diseases can cause a complex muscle wasting syndrome known as cachexia. It is commonly seen in cancer, congestive heart failure, chronic obstructive pulmonary disease, chronic kidney disease and AIDS although it is associated with many disease processes, usually with a significant inflammatory component. Cachexia causes ongoing muscle loss that is not entirely reversed with nutritional therapy. The pathophysiology is incompletely understood but inflammatory cytokines are considered to play a central role. In contrast to weight loss from inadequate caloric intake, cachexia causes predominantly muscle loss instead of fat loss and it is not as responsive to nutritional intervention. Cachexia can significantly compromise quality of life and functional status and is associated with poor outcomes.

=== Sarcopenia ===
Sarcopenia is the degenerative loss of skeletal muscle mass, quality, and strength associated with aging. This involves muscle atrophy, reduction in number of muscle fibers and a shift towards "slow twitch" or type I skeletal muscle fibers over "fast twitch" or type II fibers. The rate of muscle loss is dependent on exercise level, co-morbidities, nutrition and other factors. There are many proposed mechanisms of sarcopenia, such as a decreased capacity for oxidative phosphorylation, cellular senescence or an altered signaling of pathways regulating protein synthesis, and is considered to be the result of changes in muscle synthesis signalling pathways and gradual failure in the satellite cells which help to regenerate skeletal muscle fibers, specifically in "fast twitch" myofibers.

Sarcopenia can lead to reduction in functional status and cause significant disability but is a distinct condition from cachexia although they may co-exist. In 2016 an ICD code for sarcopenia was released, contributing to its acceptance as a disease entity.

=== Intrinsic muscle diseases ===
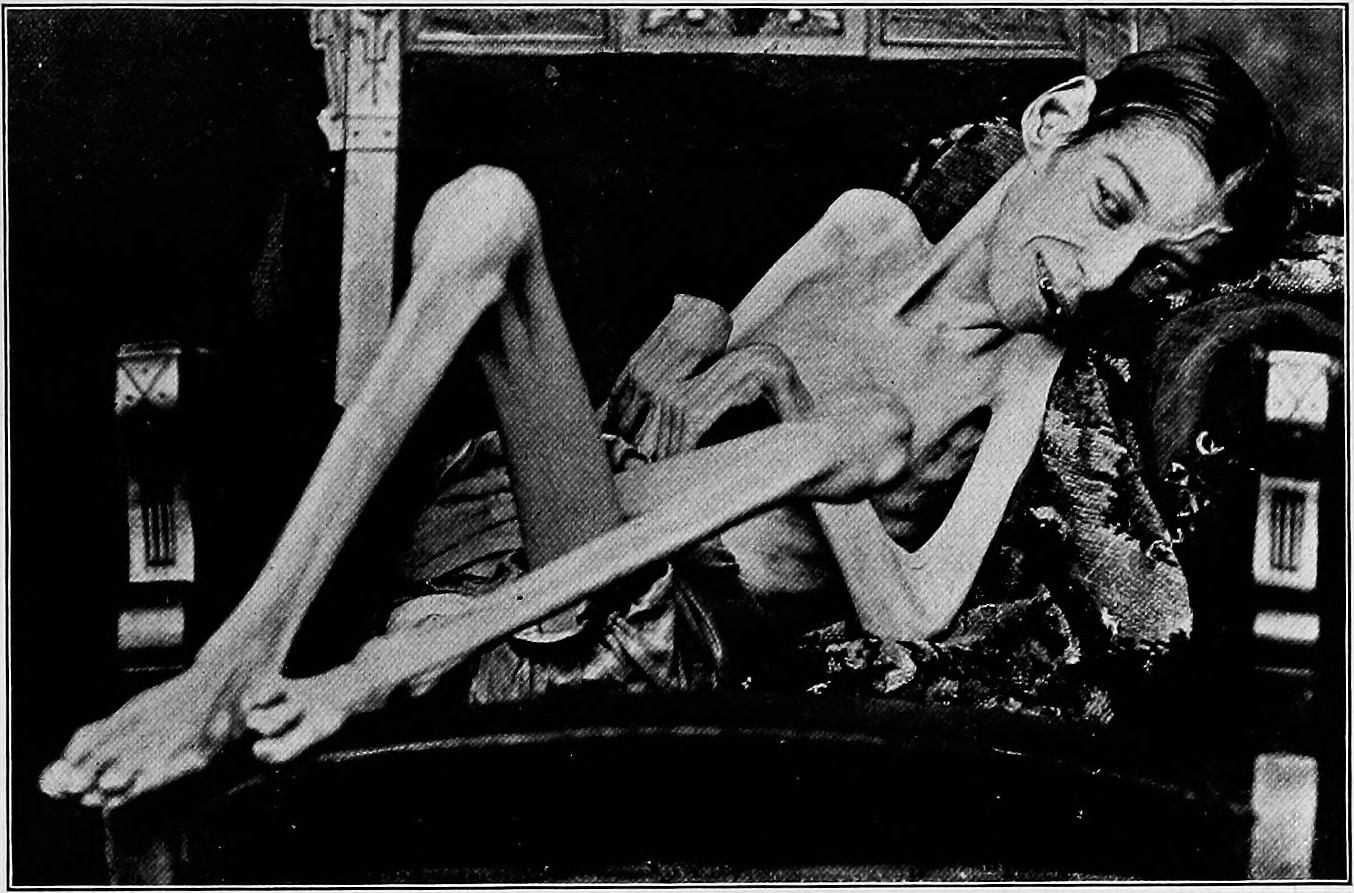
Muscle atrophy from intrinsic disease in an 18-year-old woman, weight 27 pounds (12.2 kg)

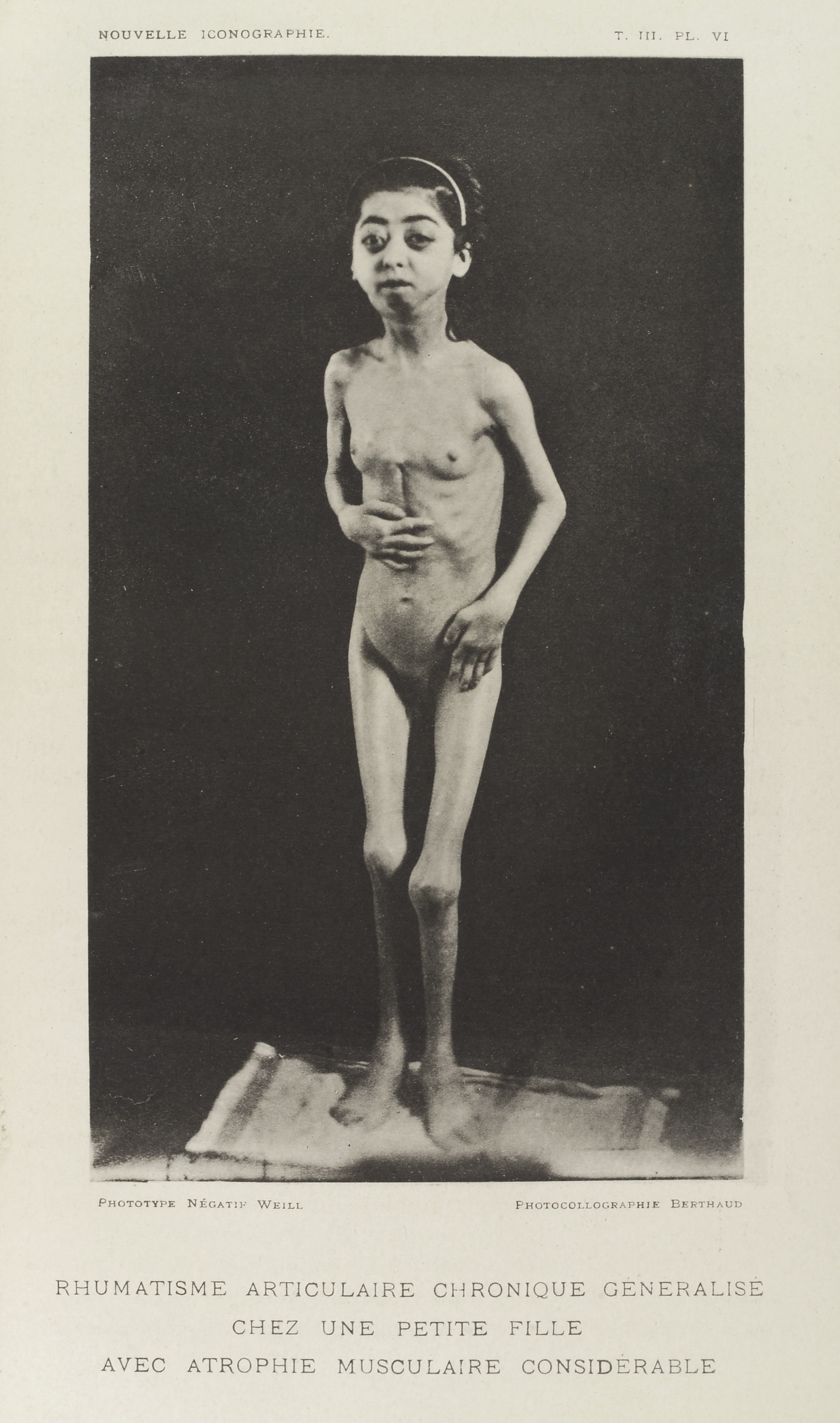
Muscle atrophy from intrinsic disease in a 17-year-old girl with chronic rheumatism

Muscle diseases, such as muscular dystrophy, amyotrophic lateral sclerosis (ALS), or myositis such as inclusion body myositis can cause muscle atrophy.

=== Central nervous system damage ===
Damage to neurons in the brain or spinal cord can cause prominent muscle atrophy. This can be localized muscle atrophy and weakness or paralysis such as in stroke or spinal cord injury. More widespread damage such as in traumatic brain injury or cerebral palsy can cause generalized muscle atrophy.

=== Peripheral nervous system damage ===
Injuries or diseases of peripheral nerves supplying specific muscles can also cause muscle atrophy. This is seen in nerve injury due to trauma or surgical complication, nerve entrapment, or inherited diseases such as Charcot-Marie-Tooth disease.

=== Medications ===
Some medications are known to cause muscle atrophy, usually due to direct effect on muscles. This includes glucocorticoids causing glucocorticoid myopathy or medications toxic to muscle such as doxorubicin.

=== Endocrinopathies ===
Disorders of the endocrine system such as Cushing's disease or hypothyroidism are known to cause muscle atrophy.

== Pathophysiology ==
Muscle atrophy occurs due to an imbalance between the normal balance between protein synthesis and protein degradation. This involves complex cell signalling that is incompletely understood and muscle atrophy is likely the result of multiple contributing mechanisms.

Mitochondrial function is crucial to skeletal muscle health and detrimental changes at the level of the mitochondria may contribute to muscle atrophy. A decline in mitochondrial density as well as quality is consistently seen in muscle atrophy due to disuse.

The ATP-dependent ubiquitin/proteasome pathway is one mechanism by which proteins are degraded in muscle. This involves specific proteins being tagged for destruction by a small peptide called ubiquitin which allows recognition by the proteasome to degrade the protein.

== Diagnosis ==
Screening for muscle atrophy is limited by a lack of established diagnostic criteria, although many have been proposed. Diagnostic criteria for other conditions such as sarcopenia or cachexia can be used. These syndromes can also be identified with screening questionnaires.

Muscle mass and changes can be quantified on imaging studies such as CT scans or Magnetic resonance imaging (MRI). Biomarkers such as urine urea can be used to roughly estimate muscle loss during circumstances of rapid muscle loss. Other biomarkers are currently under investigation but are not used in clinical practice.

== Treatment ==
Muscle atrophy can be delayed, prevented and sometimes reversed with treatment. Treatment approaches include impacting the signaling pathways that induce muscle hypertrophy or slow muscle breakdown as well as optimizing nutritional status.

Physical activity provides a significant anabolic muscle stimulus and is a crucial component to slowing or reversing muscle atrophy. It is still unknown regarding the ideal exercise "dosing." Resistance exercise has been shown to be beneficial in reducing muscle atrophy in older adults. In patients who cannot exercise due to physical limitations such as paraplegia, functional electrical stimulation can be used to externally stimulate the muscles.

Adequate calories and protein is crucial to prevent muscle atrophy. Protein needs may vary dramatically depending on metabolic factors and disease state, so high-protein supplementation may be beneficial. Supplementation of protein or branched-chain amino acids, especially leucine, can provide a stimulus for muscle synthesis and inhibit protein breakdown and has been studied for muscle atrophy for sarcopenia and cachexia. β-Hydroxy β-methylbutyrate (HMB), a metabolite of leucine which is sold as a dietary supplement, has demonstrated efficacy in preventing the loss of muscle mass in several muscle wasting conditions in humans, particularly sarcopenia. Based upon a meta-analysis of seven randomized controlled trials that was published in 2015, HMB supplementation has efficacy as a treatment for preserving lean muscle mass in older adults. More research is needed to determine the precise effects of HMB on muscle strength and function in various populations.

In severe cases of muscular atrophy, the use of an anabolic steroid such as methandrostenolone may be administered to patients as a potential treatment although use is limited by side effects. A novel class of drugs, called selective androgen receptor modulators, is being investigated with promising results. They would have fewer side effects, while still promoting muscle and bone tissue growth and regeneration. These effects have yet to be confirmed in larger clinical trials.

== Outcomes ==
Outcomes of muscle atrophy depend on the underlying cause and the health of the patient. Immobility or bed rest in populations predisposed to muscle atrophy, such as the elderly or those with disease states that commonly cause cachexia, can cause dramatic muscle atrophy and impact on functional outcomes. In the elderly, this often leads to decreased biological reserve and increased vulnerability to stressors known as the "frailty syndrome." Loss of lean body mass is also associated with increased risk of infection, decreased immunity, and poor wound healing. The weakness that accompanies muscle atrophy leads to higher risk of falls, fractures, physical disability, need for institutional care, reduced quality of life, increased mortality, and increased healthcare costs.

== Other animals ==
Inactivity and starvation in mammals lead to atrophy of skeletal muscle, accompanied by a smaller number and size of the muscle cells as well as lower protein content. In humans, prolonged periods of immobilization, as in the cases of bed rest or astronauts flying in space, are known to result in muscle weakening and atrophy. Such consequences are also noted in small hibernating mammals like the golden-mantled ground squirrels and brown bats. A striking example of human-induced atrophy is seen in Amar Bharati, an Indian sadhu who held his arm raised for decades as a spiritual devotion, resulting in severe muscle atrophy and loss of function in the limb.

Bears are an exception to this rule; species in the family Ursidae are famous for their ability to survive unfavorable environmental conditions of low temperatures and limited nutrition availability during winter by means of hibernation. During that time, bears go through a series of physiological, morphological, and behavioral changes. Their ability to maintain skeletal muscle number and size during disuse is of significant importance.

During hibernation, bears spend 4–7 months of inactivity and anorexia without undergoing muscle atrophy and protein loss. A few known factors contribute to the sustaining of muscle tissue. During the summer, bears take advantage of the nutrition availability and accumulate muscle protein. The protein balance at time of dormancy is also maintained by lower levels of protein breakdown during the winter. At times of immobility, muscle wasting in bears is also suppressed by a proteolytic inhibitor that is released in circulation. Another factor that contributes to the sustaining of muscle strength in hibernating bears is the occurrence of periodic voluntary contractions and involuntary contractions from shivering during torpor. The three to four daily episodes of muscle activity are responsible for the maintenance of muscle strength and responsiveness in bears during hibernation.

== Pre-clinical models ==
Muscle-atrophy can be induced in pre-clinical models (e.g. mice) to study the effects of therapeutic interventions against muscle-atrophy. Restriction of the diet, i.e. caloric restriction, leads to a significant loss of muscle mass within two weeks, and loss of muscle-mass can be rescued by a nutritional intervention. Immobilization of one of the hindlegs of mice leads to muscle-atrophy as well, and is hallmarked by loss of both muscle mass and strength. Food restriction and immobilization may be used in mouse models and have been shown to overlap with mechanisms associated to sarcopenia in humans.

== See also ==
- Sarcopenia
- Cachexia
- Effect of spaceflight on the human body
- Muscle weakness
- Muscular dystrophy
- Muscle hypertrophy
- Myotonic dystrophy
- Journal of Cachexia, Sarcopenia and Muscle
