= Chanpatia =

Chanpatia Chanakyapattnam West Champaran
- Town
- Location in Bihar, India Chanpatia (India)
- Coordinates: 26.94543°N 84.55238°E
- Country: India
- State: Bihar
- District: Pashchim Champaran

Government
  - Type: Nagar Panchayat
  - Chairman: Smt. Rajni Devi
  - Deputy Chairman: Sunil Kumar

Population (2020)
  - Total: 220,290

Languages
  - Official: Hindi, Bhojpuri.
- Time zone: UTC+5:30 (IST)
- PIN: 845449
- ISO 3166 code: IN-BR
- Vehicle registration: 22
- Lok Sabha constituency: Paschim Champaran
- Vidhan Sabha constituency: Chanpatia
- Website: westchamparan.bih.nic.in

Chanpatia is a city in Nagar Panchayat situated on the bank of the Burhi Gandak River. It is the administrative headquarters of the Chanpatia block in Paschim Champaran district near the Indo-Nepal border; 18 km from District headquarters Bettiah, 242 km north-west of the capital Patna in the state of Bihar, India. Chanpatia is well-known for its cuisine, such as Marcha Ka chura (flattened rice), Basmati rice, and Handi kabab.

The majority of the population is traditionally dependent upon agriculture. There are also many small-scale industries present in the area. In modern times, Chanpatia is experiencing more rapid growth and development. The Chanpatia startup zone was initiated during lockdown, providing employment and economic opportunities to those in need. Textiles and clothes produced by this startup zone have seen a great deal of interest and demand.

The city of Chanpatia is mainly divided into 15 wards. The Chairman of Chanpatia Nagar Panchayat is Smt. Rajni Devi, and the Deputy Chairman of Chanpatia Nagar Panchayat is Sunil Kumar.

== Demographics ==
As of the 2001 census of India, Chanpatia had a population of 34,098. Males constituted 52% of the population and females 48%. Chanpatia had an average literacy rate of 49%, lower than the national average of 59.5%; with male literacy of 58% and female literacy of 39%. 19% of the population is under 6 years of age. Major crops grown in this area are sugarcane, wheat, and rice.

== Politics ==
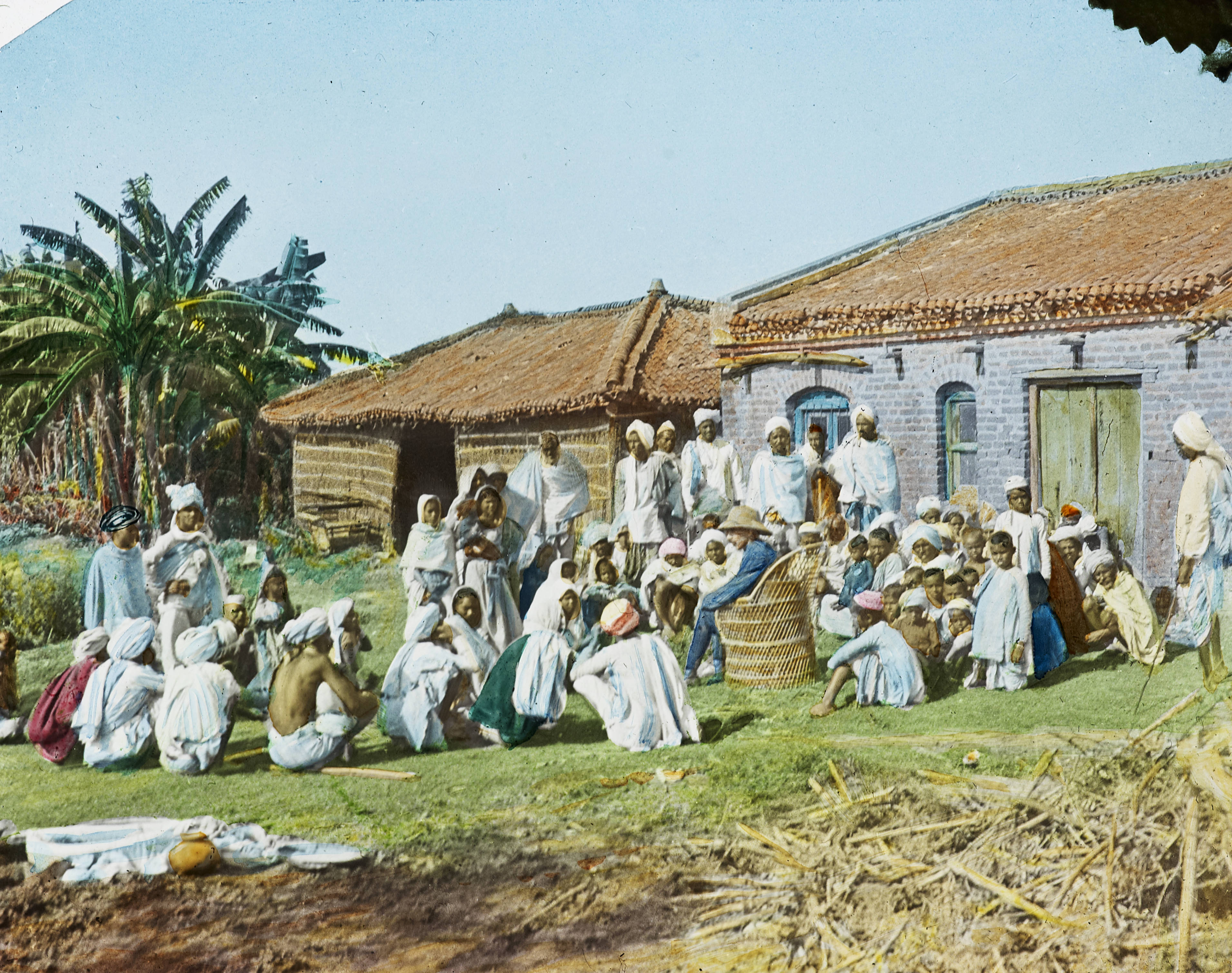
Chanpatia- Dispensary, India, ca. 1906

It is part of Chanpatia Assembly constituency.

== Local Language ==
Hindi is the official language, and Bhojpuri is the regional language used by the people of Chanpatia.

== Transportation ==
Chanpatia is well connected to many cities like Patna, Lucknow, Muzaffarpur, Kolkata, New Delhi, and Mumbai through roadways and railways. The railway station, Chanpatia railway station, is situated on the Muzaffarpur–Gorakhpur main line. Another nearby railway station connecting to Chanpatia is Bettiah railway station and Narkatiaganj Junction railway station.

Chanpatia does not have an airport.
