= List of feline diseases =

Feline disease refers to infections or illnesses that affect cats. They may cause symptoms, sickness or the death of the animal. Some diseases are symptomatic in one cat but asymptomatic in others. Feline diseases are often opportunistic and tend to be more serious in cats that already have concurrent sicknesses. Some of these can be treated and the animal can have a complete recovery. Others, like viral diseases, are more difficult to treat and cannot be treated with antibiotics, which are not effective against viruses.

- Aggressive fibromatosis
- Aspergillosis
- Avian influenza in cats
- Bladder cancer in cats and dogs
- Bone cancer in cats and dogs
- Cancer in cats
- Cat worm infections
- Cat flu, an upper respiratory tract infection, caused by:
  - Bordetella bronchiseptica
  - Chlamydophila felis
  - Feline calicivirus
  - Feline viral rhinotracheitis (FVR)
  - FHV-1
- Cat-scratch disease
- Cat skin disorders
- Central retinal degeneration
- Chronic kidney disease in cats § Cats
- Coccidia
- Cowpox
- Cryptosporidiosis
- Cuterebriasis
- Diabetes in cats
- Diaphragmatic hernia
- Dirofilaria immitis
- Dry eye syndrome
- Ectopia lentis
- Eosinophilic granuloma
- Fading kitten syndrome, a broad term for neonatal decline and death that has several potential causes, including infection, congenital malformation, environmental or nutritional deficits, and neonatal isoerythrolysis
- Feline acne
- Feline asthma
- Feline cognitive dysfunction
- Feline coronavirus
- Feline cystitis
- Feline cutaneous asthenia
- Feline distemper
- Feline foamy virus
- Feline hepatic lipidosis
- Feline hyperadrenocorticism
- Feline hyperaldosteronism
- Feline hyperesthesia syndrome
- Feline hyperthyroidism
- Feline hypoadrenocorticism
- Feline immunodeficiency virus
- Feline infectious anemia
- Feline infectious peritonitis
- Feline leprosy syndrome caused by Mycobacterium lepraemurium
- Feline leptospirosis
- Feline leukemia virus
- Feline lower urinary tract disease
- Feline lymphoma
- Feline odontoclastic resorptive lesion
- Feline panleukopenia
- Feline sarcoma virus
- Feline spongiform encephalopathy
- Feline viral enteritis
- Flat-chested kitten syndrome
- Flea allergy dermatitis
- Flea-borne spotted fever caused by Rickettsia felis
- Florida keratopathy
- Haemophilus felis
- Head pressing
- Heart valve dysplasia
- Hookworm infection
- Hypertrophic cardiomyopathy
- Leishmaniasis
- Luxating patella
- Lyme disease
- Lymphocytopenia
- Mastocytoma
- Miliary dermatitis
- Otitis externa in animals
- Paragonimus
- Polyneuropathy in dogs and cats
- Portosystemic shunt
- Protothecosis
- Pseudorabies (Morbus Aujeszky), originating from swine
- Psychogenic alopecia
- Pyometra
- Rabies
- Retinitis pigmentosa
- Salmonellosis
- Tetanus
- Thelaziasis
- Toxocariasis
- Toxoplasmosis caused by Toxoplasma gondii
- Tritrichomonas blagburni
- Tyzzer's disease
- Vaccine-associated sarcoma

== See also ==
- Cat health
- Feline arterial thromboembolism
