= Saluki =

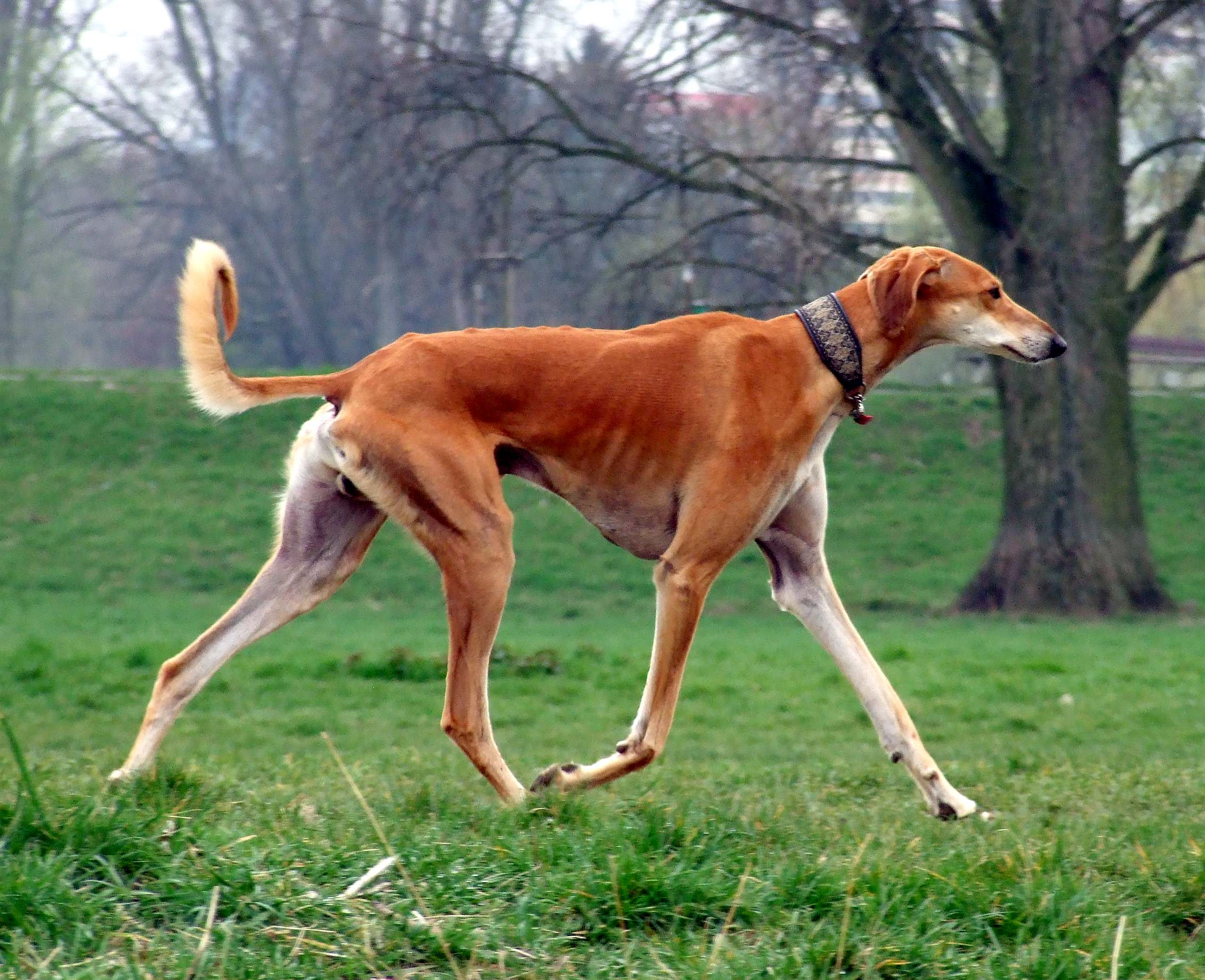
- Origin: Fertile Crescent
Traits
- Height: 58–71 cm (23–28 in)
- Weight: 18–27 kg (40–60 lb)
- Coat: Smooth and "feathered"
- Color: White, cream, fawn, red, grizzle/tan, black/tan, and tri-color (white, black and tan)
Kennel club standards
- Fédération Cynologique Internationale: standard

The Saluki or Arabian hound or Persian hound (Persian: سگ تازی،; Arabic: سلوقي) is a standardised breed developed from sighthounds – dogs that hunt primarily by sight rather than strong scent – that was once used by nomadic tribes to run down game animals. The dog was originally bred in the Fertile Crescent. The modern breed is typically deep-chested and long-legged, and similar dogs appear in medieval and ancient art. The breed is most closely related to the Afghan Hound, a basal breed that predates the emergence of modern breeds in the 19th century, and the Saluki has been purebred both in the Middle East, including by royalty, since at least that era, and in the West (especially in Britain and Germany) since the 1840s (with breed standards established in the West and the Middle East around the 1920s–1930s), though as a free-breeding landrace, similar dogs are common as feral animals in the Middle East. A related standardised breed is the north African Sloughi. The saluki is one possible explanation for the mythical Set animal.

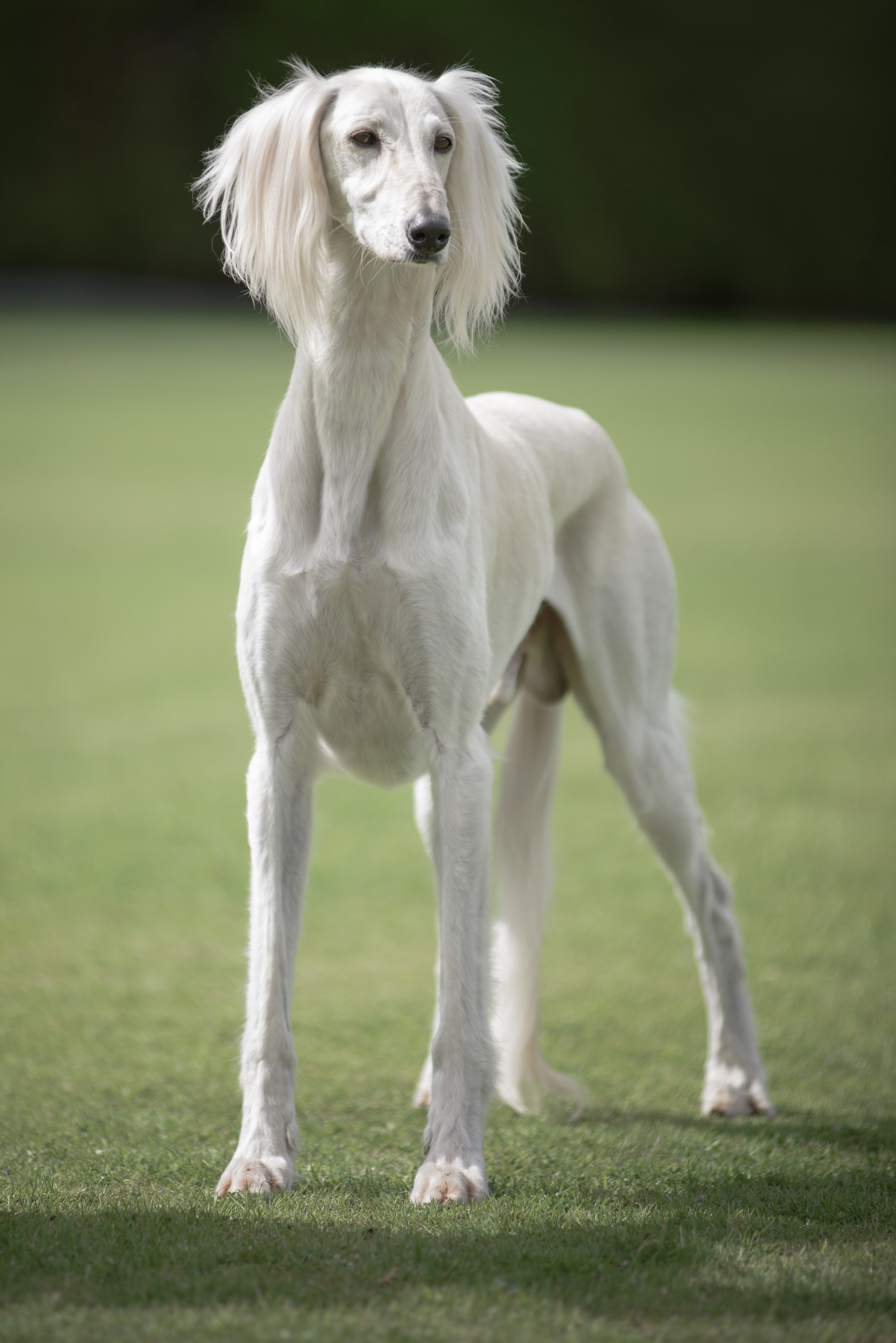
Saluki dog

== Name ==
The origins of the name of the breed are not clear. The Saluki has also been called the gazelle hound, Arabian hound, and the Persian greyhound. One suggested origin of the breed's name is ancient Sumerian salu-ki translating to 'plunge-earth'. However, there is no evidence a breed existed then or was referred to by the Sumerians with this name, nor is it certain what "plunge [to/into] earth" might have meant in reference to dogs. It is suggestive of digging for burrowing prey animals, but there is also a story of dogs being thrown toward quarry animals by a camel-mounted hunter.

The name used for the modern breed could be derived from Saluqiyyah (Arabic for "Seleucia", a city of Mesopotamia now in Iraq), appearing in pre-Islamic Arabic poetry. However, this is disputed. British diplomat Terence Clark wrote that the Arabic word saluqi indicates 'person or thing from a place named Saluq'. Arab tradition states that Saluq was an ancient town in Yemen not far from modern Taiz, and the Arabs associate this town with the origin of the breed. However, the word saluqi might have been derived from reference to several other places: Saluq in Armenia, and three towns called Saluqiyah. One has become modern Silifke, Turkey; another is near Antioch (modern Antakya), Turkey; and third is located near Baghdad, Iraq. Baghdad eclipsed Ctesiphon, the capital of the Persian Empire, which was located some 30 km (20 mi) to the southeast. Ctesiphon itself had replaced and absorbed Seleucia, the first capital of the Seleucid Empire (312 BC – 65 AD).

Regardless, the adjective saluqi may have been derived by the Arabs of the Arabian Peninsula from the similar-sounding word for Seleucid used in the Aramaic and Syriac languages spoken there by the Assyrians of that part of Mesopotamia, but there is no irrefutable evidence.

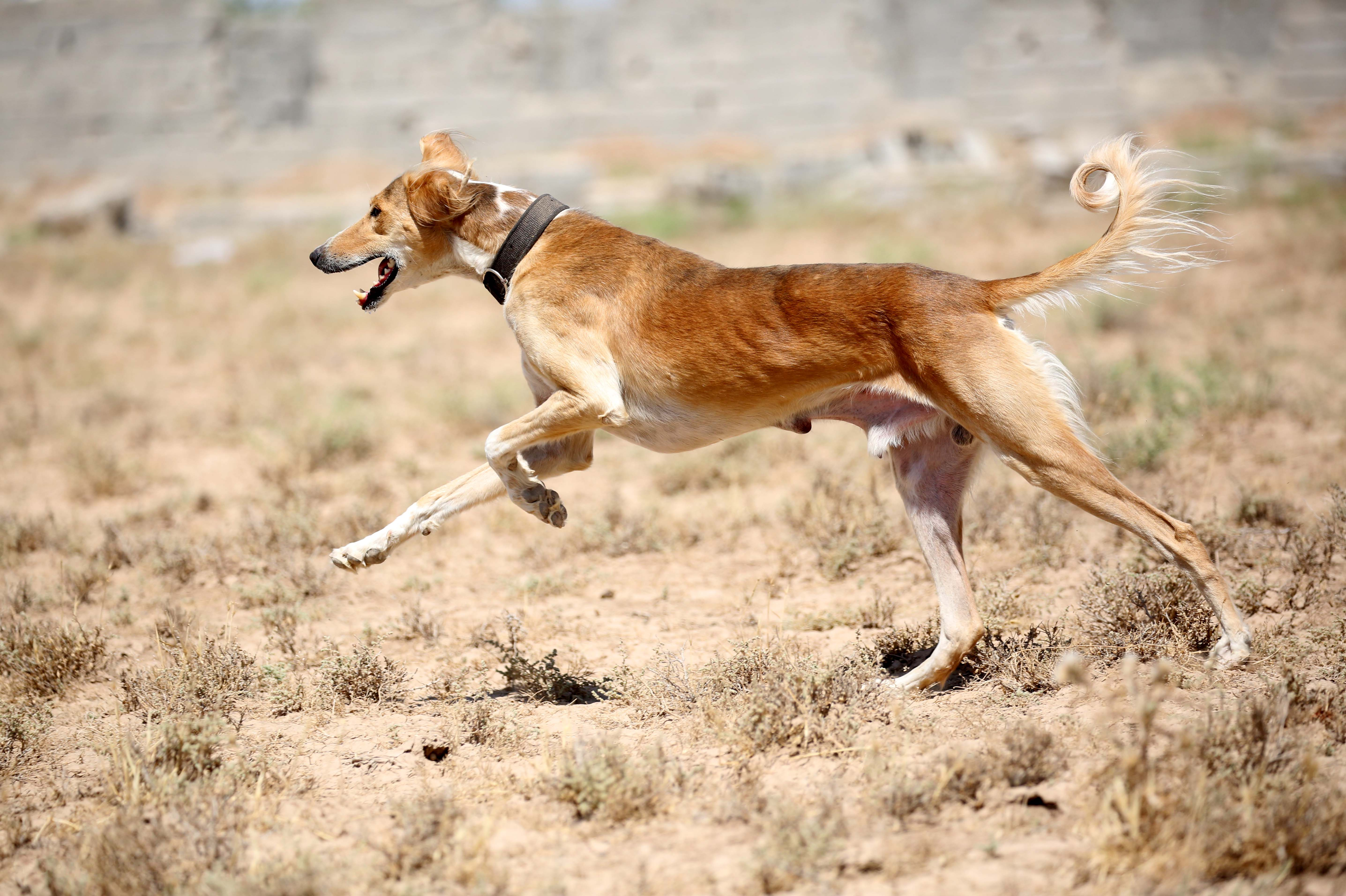
Kurdish Saluki from the west of Iran

== Description ==
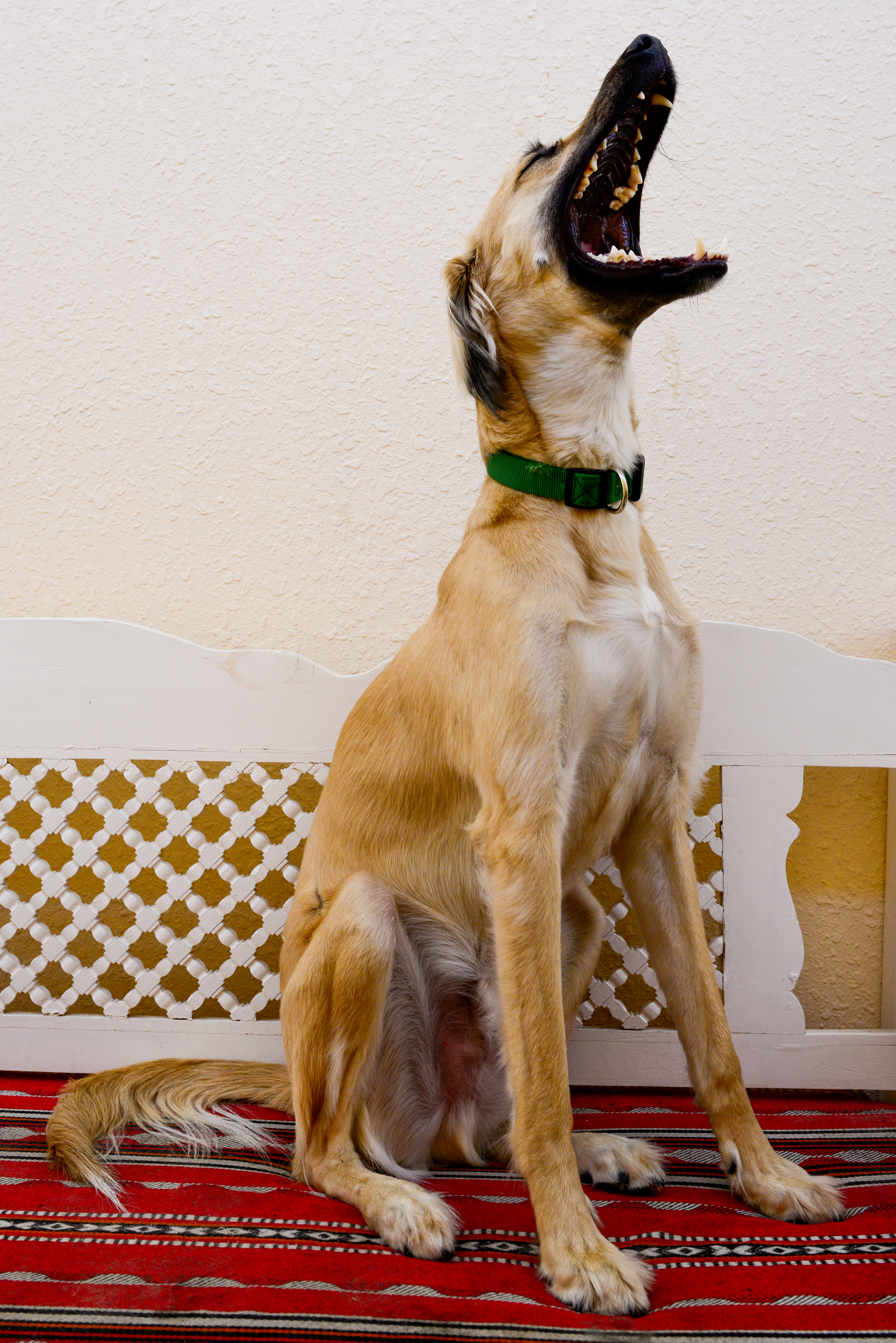
"Feathered" Saluki from Qatar

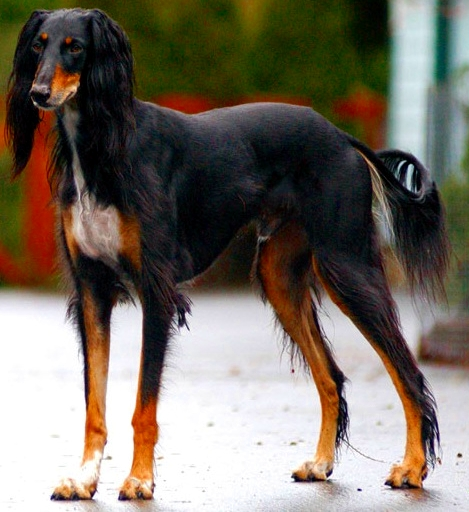
Saluki with a dark colored coat

Salukis are sighthounds – hunting by sight more than scent or sound – and run their quarry down to kill or retrieve it. The normal size range for the modern breed is 58–71 centimetres (23–28 in) high at the withers and 16–32 kilograms (35–70 lb) in weight. Female Salukis are slightly smaller than males. The head is long and narrow with large eyes and drop ears. The tail of the breed is long and curved. It has the typical deep-chested, long-legged body of sighthounds. The coat comes in a variety of colors including white, cream, fawn, red, grizzle/tan, black/tan, and tri-color (white, black and tan).

The overall appearance of the Saluki is grace and symmetry. Two coat types – smooth and "feathered" – are evident in the breed's gene pool. The latter variety has light fluffing on the back of the legs, thighs, ears, and sometimes the throat. The fur on both types is silky and is low-shedding when compared to other breeds. Salukis bred in the Middle East most commonly have short hair.

There is a type called "desert Saluki" or "Sinai Saluki" or "Hijazi Saluki", which descends from bloodlines brought directly from the original region of the breed. It exists in the entire Middle Eastern region but the origin is West of the Arabian Peninsula. In Israel the type is known as the "Negev Saluki". The desert Saluki does not have influence of western lines and it tends to have a more primitive appearance. It often has a broader skull, shorter muzzle, shorter and more compact body, broader chest, less angulations, and shorter tail than the western equivalent. Some desert Salukis imported from the original region have cropped ears because of the common tradition in countries such as Iran, Iraq, Turkey, and Syria. However, it is difficult to strictly determine what desert Salukis originated from due to the "original" bloodlines being bred in the Western world for 4 to 5 generations. The breed existed in the US by the 1980s and there has been breeding in France since the 1990s. The first desert Salukis in Finland were imported from Israel in February 2000. After that, more have been imported from countries such as Syria, Oman, Qatar, and Turkey. In addition to their countries of birth, they have for example Iranian, Moroccan, Bahraini, and Saudi Arabian "Bedouin Saluki" dogs in their background.

== Swiftness and physical capacity ==
While the Greyhound is credited as being the fastest dog breed up to distances of around 800 metres (2,600 ft), the Saluki is thought to be faster over longer distances. In 1996, The Guinness Book of Records listed a Saluki as being the fastest dog, capable of reaching a speed of 68.8 km/h (42.8 mph). Due to its heavily padded feet being able to absorb the impact on its body, the Saluki has remarkable stamina when running.

Historically, the ancestors of the modern Saluki breed were used for hunting by nomadic tribes. Typical quarry included the gazelle, hare, fox and jackal. While hunting hares, Bedouin hunters would sometimes ride close to their quarry on a camel holding such a dog, which would be thrown towards the prey while at speed to give the dog a running start. Gazelle hunters have also used hawks or falcons to attack the head of the prey so that the dogs could then bring down the distracted animal.

== Temperament ==
The modern Saluki has retained qualities of hunting hounds and may seem reserved to strangers. The often independent and aloof breed may be difficult to train, and they generally cannot be trusted to return to their owner when off-leash. Training methods have been recommended to be always gentle and patient. Salukis may bore easily and are not an ideal breed to leave unattended for long periods; however, they are well-suited to life in apartments, since they are generally quiet and calm as adults. The saluki does not typically enjoy rough games or activities such as retrieving balls, but does enjoy soft toys. Early socialisation will help prevent timidity and shyness in later life. Given its hunting instincts, the dog is prone to chasing moving objects, such as cats, birds, squirrels, and bugs.

== Health ==
A 2024 UK study found a life expectancy of 13.3 years for the breed compared to an average of 12.7 for purebreeds and 12 for crossbreeds.

In a 2006 breed-specific survey conducted by The Kennel Club and the British Small Animal Veterinary Association Scientific Committee, responses highlighted several health issues. The primary cause of death identified was cancer, being responsible for 35.6% of deaths, with the most common forms being liver cancer or lymphoma. The second most common cause was related to cardiac conditions, including heart failure and unspecified heart defects. Cardiomyopathy, heart murmur, and other cardiac issues were present in 17.2% of responses while dermatolic conditions such as dermatitis or alopecia were reported by 10.8% of responses. Old age is listed as the third most frequent cause of death.

Hip dysplasia is uncommon in Salukis, with the breed ranking joint lowest in a survey by the British Veterinary Association in 2003. The breed scored an average of 5 points, with a score of 0 being low, while 106 is high.

== History ==
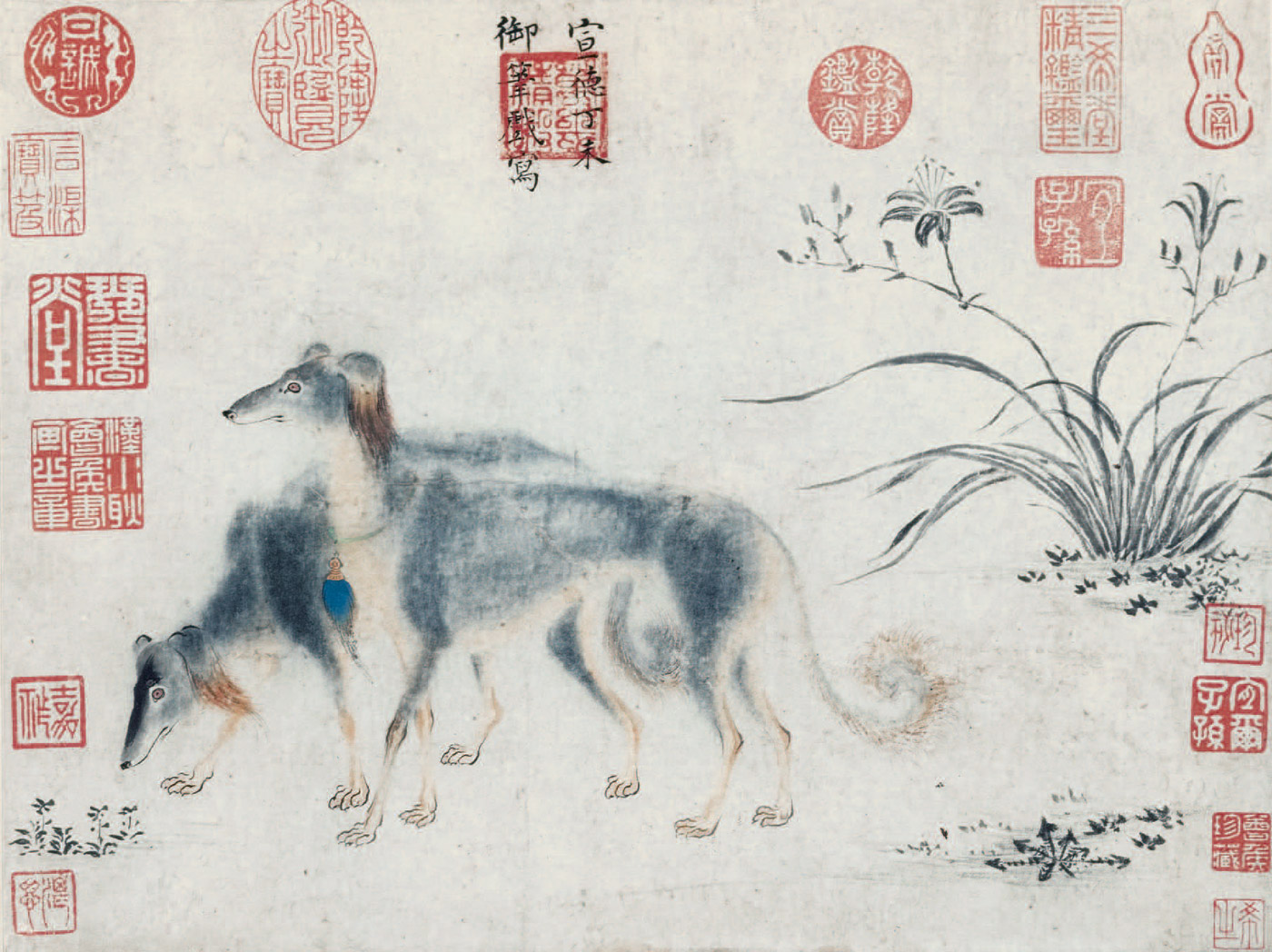
Two Salukis [modern title], painted by the Xuande Emperor of China (1399–1435).

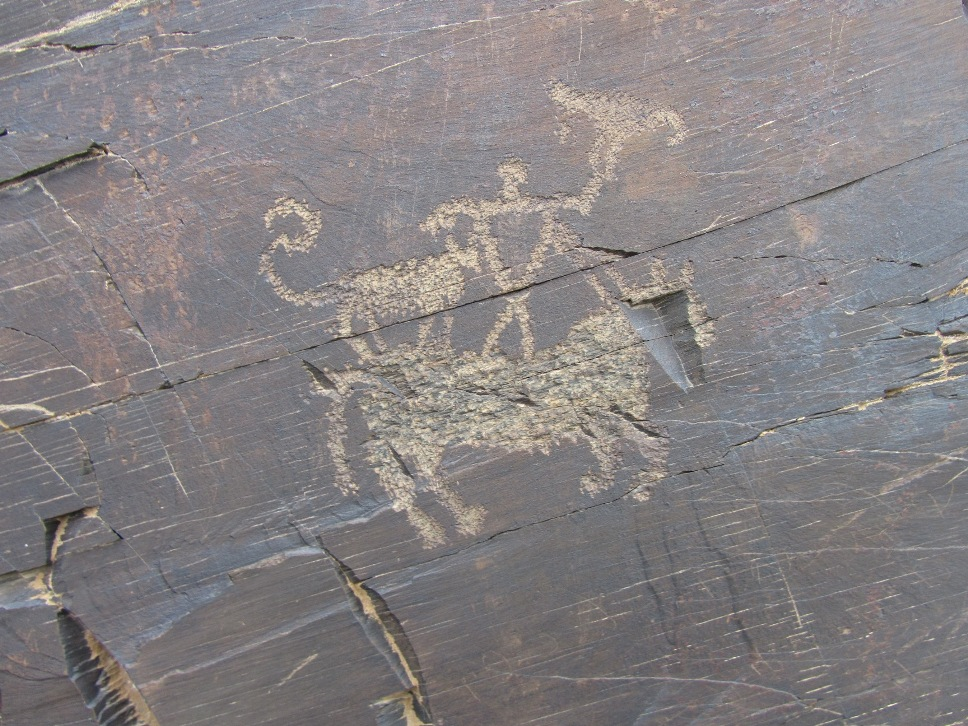
Golpayegan petroglyph of 10,000–12,000 years ago shows a dog, a hunter and a hawk.

The Saluki's ancestors were historically bred in the Fertile Crescent, where agriculture originated. Images of running dogs with long, narrow bodies adorn pottery found in Susa, southwest Iran that dates back to 6,000 years ago, despite the depictions bearing erect, pointed ears. Dogs looking similar to Salukis are shown on wall carvings of the Sumerian civilization (now Iraq), dating from 6,000 to 7,000 BC. The ancient skeletal remains of a dog identified as being of the Greyhound/Saluki form was excavated at Tell Brak in modern Syria, and dated to approximately 4,000 years before present. Dogs that look similar to Salukis and Greyhounds were increasingly depicted on Egyptian tombs from the Middle Kingdom (2134 BC–1785 BC) onward, however it was during the Eighteenth dynasty of Egypt that Saluki-like dogs rose to prominence, replacing hunting dogs called tesem (thought to be similar to modern pariah dogs or a generic term for a dog) in ancient Egyptian art. The variety spread southward into the Sudan.

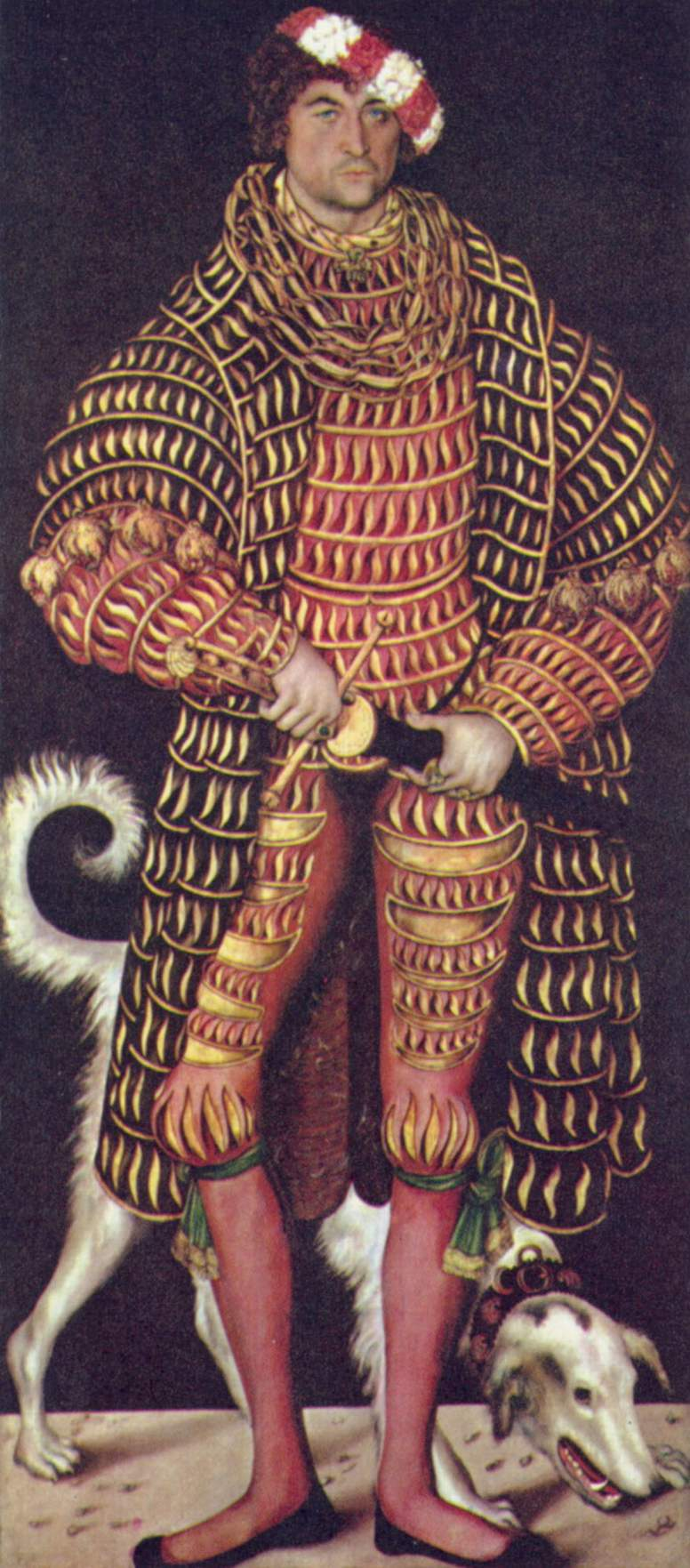
The painting of Henry IV, Duke of Saxony, by Lucas Cranach pictures a dog that resembles a Saluki

From Iran, such dogs are mentioned in the poetry of Khaghani (1121–1190), depicted in miniature paintings of hunting scenes along with horseback archers by Master Kamāl ud-Dīn Behzād (1450–1535), depicted in book illustrations by 'Abd al-Wahhab ibn 'Abd al-Fattah ibn 'Ali (1516).

The Silk Road was a trading route that stretched from ancient Iran to China. Examples of dogs that look like Salukis were painted by the Chinese, fifth Ming Emperor Zhū Zhānjī, known more commonly as the Xuande Emperor during the Ming Dynasty (1368–1644). The inscription on the painting reads "playfully painted [by the] imperial brush" in 1427; additional red seals were added in later years by owners of the painting, which also reveals that the painting was in the Imperial Chinese collection in the 18th century. Other earlier artifacts place similar Saluki-like dogs further back in Chinese history to the 7th Century Tang dynasty or even before that. The contemporary Chinese sighthound, the Xigou, is considered to have an ancient history which may be linked to historic Silk Road Saluki imports, but it is notable that in a recent genomic comparison of existing dogs, the Xigou was separated from both groups of sighthounds, the Western, as well Eastern (which includes the Saluki).

From Europe, the legend maintains that the returning crusaders brought Saluki-type dogs from the Middle East. The painting of Henry IV, Duke of Saxony with his hunting dog, painted by Lucas Cranach the Elder in 1514, shows a dog thought by some to represent an ancestral Saluki. The dog wears a collar decorated with a scallop shell, which is the badge of a pilgrim who has traveled the Way of Saint James in Spain. Saluki-type dogs appear in Paolo Veronese's 1573 work The Adoration of the Magi (also known as the Adoration of the Kings), currently located at the National Gallery, London. Veronese painted such dogs in another two of his religious paintings: The Marriage at Cana and The Finding of Moses.

Sheik Hamad ibn Isa Al Khalifa, King of Bahrain during the 1930s, was known for a pack of Salukis that accompanied him throughout the Arab world on hunting trips. Following his death, his son Salman ibn Hamad Al Khalifa attempted to keep the lines pure-bred but they became interbred with other breeds. However, the pure-bred lines of the royal kennel were saved by the efforts of Dana Al Khalifa who was given two pure-bred puppies by the King, and about a decade later had pure-bred Salukis registered with the Kennel Club of Bahrain. Today, the breed is still held in high regard throughout the Middle East and were hunting dogs for nobles and rulers around the region. Although Muslims traditionally regarded dogs as unclean, they made an exception for the Saluki to live in the family tent. Salukis were typically never sold, but could be presented as a mark of honor to people. They are considered clean by the Bedouins, and are allowed to be in women's quarters, while other dogs must be kept outside.

In 2014, a DNA study compared dogs and wolves for AMY2B (alpha amylase 2B), which is a gene and enzyme that assists with the first step in the digestion of dietary starch and glycogen. An expansion of this gene in dogs would enable early dogs to exploit a starch-rich diet as they fed on refuse from agriculture. Data indicated that the wolves and dingo had just two copies of the gene and the Siberian husky that is associated with hunter-gatherers had just 3–4 copies, "whereas the Saluki, which was historically bred in the Fertile Crescent where agriculture originated, has 29 copies".

=== Breeding in the West ===
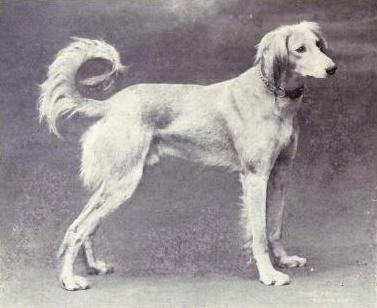
A Gazelle Hound from Dogs of All Nations (1915), its country of origin listed as India.

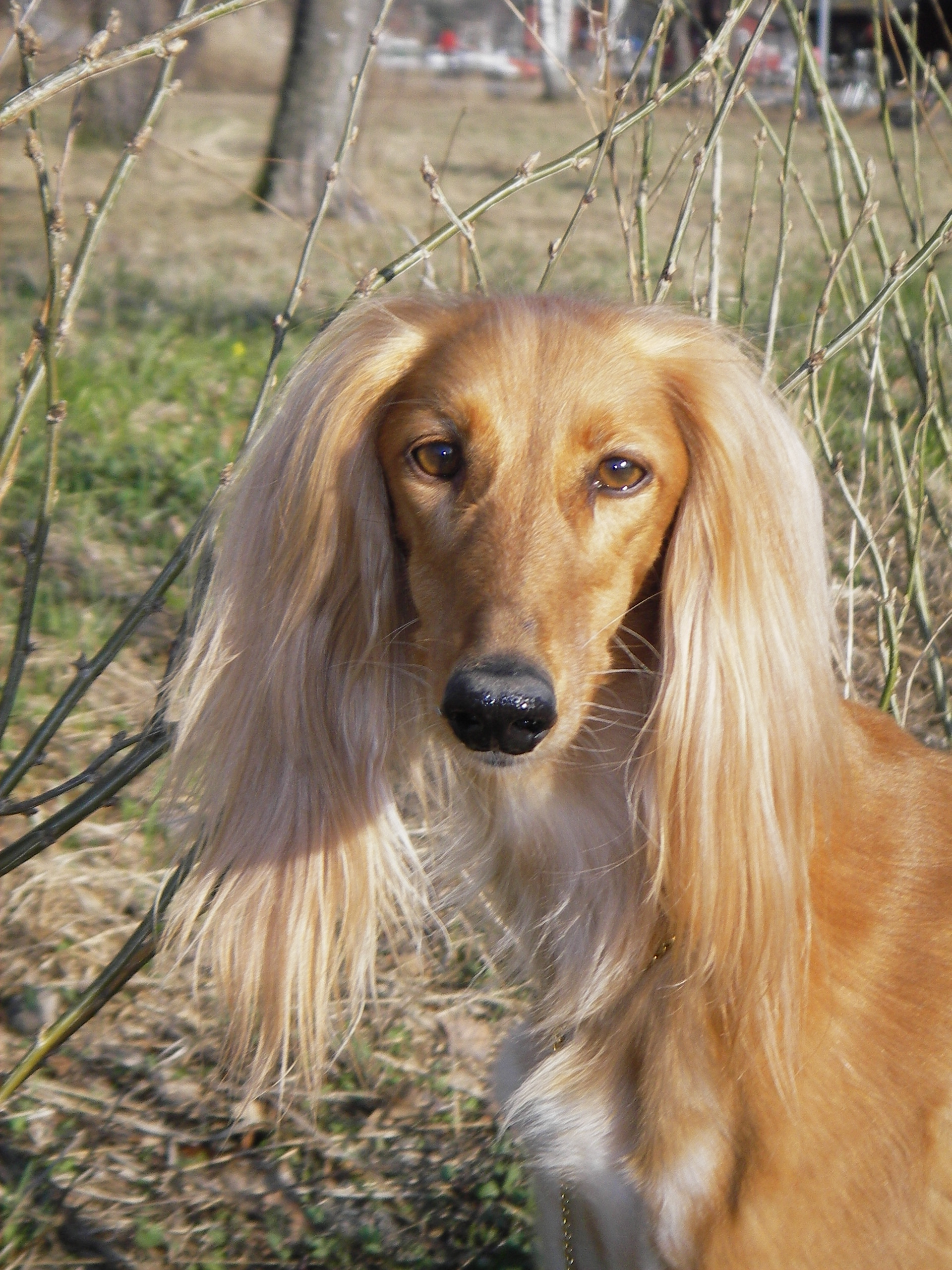
The popularity of the Saluki in the United States, according to the American Kennel Club, has remained relatively stable over the past decade

It was not until 1840 that Salukis were first brought to England. Referred to as a "slughi shami", they and the modern Sloughi were treated as the same breed; however, recent genetic tests have shown that the two breeds are genetically separate. The first successful modern breeding line of Salukis began in 1895, with Florence Amherst (daughter of the 1st Baron Amherst of Hackney). Having seen Salukis on a Nile tour in that year, she imported a breeding pair from the Al Salihah area of Lower Egypt. A champion of breed purity, she struggled alone for nearly three decades, and real popularity of the Saluki in Europe did not take hold until the early 1920s, when officers returning from the Middle Eastern theatre of World War I and from the Arab Revolt brought their pet Salukis home with them.

One of these was Brigadier General Frederick Lance of the 19th Lancers, and his wife, Gladys, who returned to Britain with two Salukis from Sarona, Palestine, where he had been stationed during the post-war occupation. The Lances were both keen hunters, and rode with their pack of dogs, including both Salukis and terriers, to course jackal and Dorcas gazelle whilst stationed in the desert. They imported a male, named Sarona Kelb, who became an influence on the breed in the West.

Together, the Lances with Florence Amherst mounted a campaign for recognition of the Middle Eastern breed, that coincided with the phenomenon of "Tutmania" caused by Howard Carter's discovery of Tutankhamun's tomb in late 1922. In 1923, the Saluki or Gazelle Hound Club was formed, and the Kennel Club granted official recognition to the breed. The first registered Salukis in the Western studbook were Cyrus and Slongha Peri, imported from Iran and registered with the German kennel club Deutscher Windhundzucht- und Rennverband (DWZRV). DWZRV also recorded the first litter born in the West in 1922.

Imports to England during the interwar years were chiefly from areas of British military influence and commerce: Bahrain, Egypt, Transjordan, and Iraq. Both Florence Amherst and the Lances imported breeding stock from the latter two countries. Despite substantial populations of Salukis in Germany, the Netherlands, and Sweden, none of these were imported to England.

English Salukis (chiefly descendants of Sarona Kelb) were exported to many countries, but by the mid-1930s, interest slackened, and with the outbreak of World War II, breeding and show activities almost entirely stopped. The number of litters was minimal – just enough to keep the breed alive. Food rationing reserved all edible meat for humans, and to prevent the Salukis from dying from starvation or being killed by bombs, some owners euthanised entire kennels. A small number of Saluki kennels in the West survived the war, and along with fresh imports belonging to a second wave of soldiers returning from the Middle East, the slow process of re-establishing the breed began.

Popularity of Salukis dramatically increased, and the Saluki Club of America was founded in 1927. Salukis were recognised by the Kennel Club (UK) in 1923, and by the American Kennel Club in 1929. The breed is also the mascot of Southern Illinois University Carbondale.

The popularity of the Saluki in the United States, according to the American Kennel Club, has remained relatively stable in the 2000s, with the breed ranked 107th in 1999, had decreased to 118th in 2008, but by 2008 had increased once again to 112th. As of 2024, the Saluki has a popularity of 141st of 202. Between 2000 and 2009, 1,215 Salukis were registered with The Kennel Club in the UK, while this does not approach the numbers of the more popular breeds, it is in line with similar breeds in the hound group such as the Borzoi, which had 1,399 puppies registered in the same period. In September 2007, the Kennel Club Art Gallery's 12th exhibition, "The Saluki in Art", celebrated the breed, showing a range of exhibits including terracotta and bronze works, along with contemporary artists and a range of trophies from Saluki breed clubs.

=== Rescue ===
Salukis (or landrace dogs similar to them) are common throughout the Middle East, and are sometimes abandoned. Rescue organisations work with shelters in Qatar, Bahrain, and elsewhere, and directly with a network of rescuers in Kuwait, and Oman, to find the dogs adoptive homes in Europe and North America.
