= Chronic kidney disease in cats =

Incurable progressive feline disease

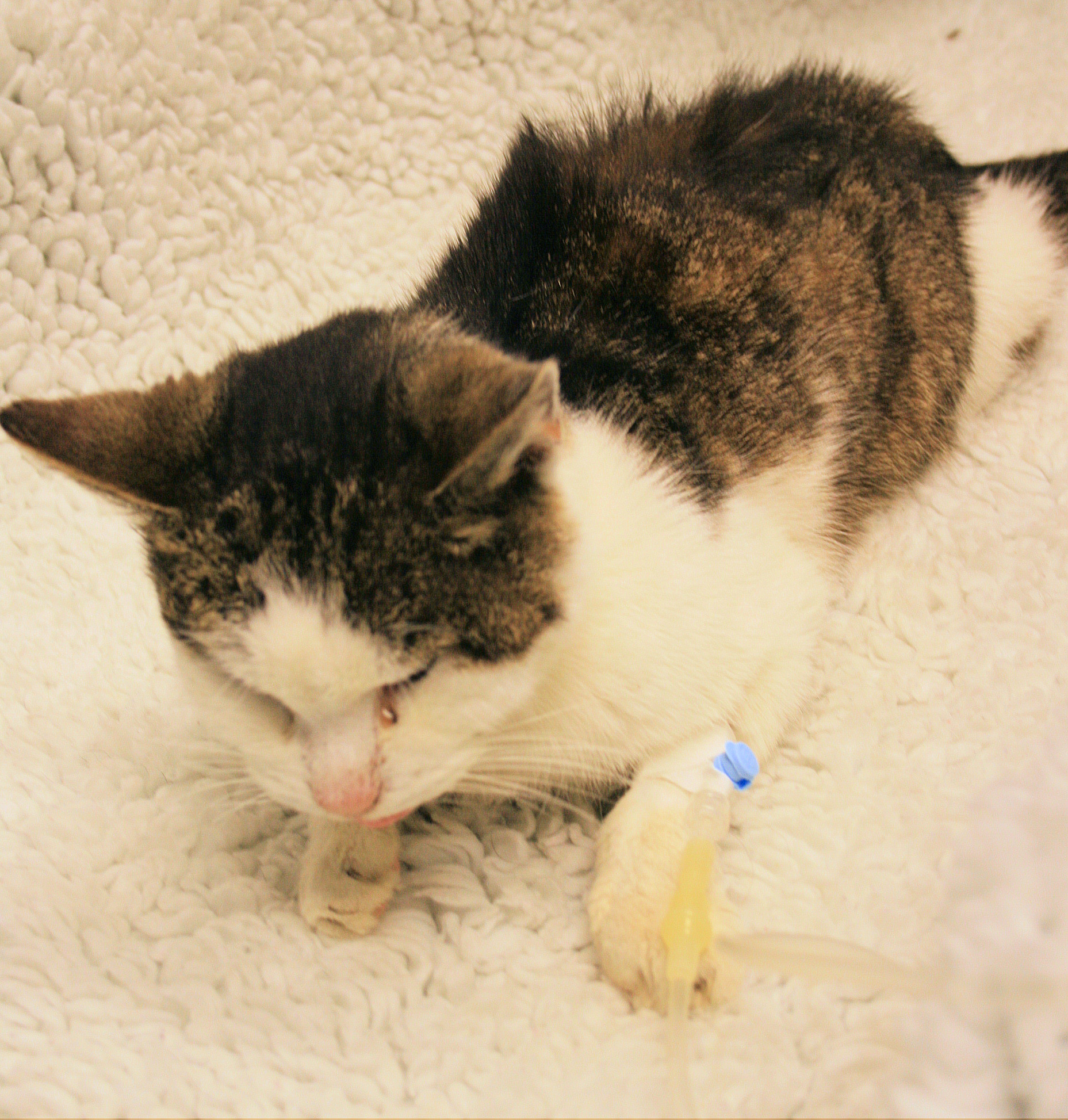
A cat with chronic kidney disease and typical symptoms: fatigue, emaciation and dull, shaggy coat

The chronic kidney disease of the cat (CKD or CNE)—also called chronic renal insufficiency (CRI or CNI) or chronic renal failure (CRF) in the older literature—is an incurable, progressive disease characterized by a gradual decrease in the nephrons and thus to a decreasing function (insufficiency) of the kidneys. It is one of the most common causes of death in older domestic cats. In current literature, the term "kidney disease" is preferred to the term "renal insufficiency" because the disease initially progresses without any measurable decline in kidney function. Due to the different type of diet and the resulting metabolic peculiarities, the clinical picture and treatment sometimes differ significantly from chronic renal failure in humans.

Chronic kidney disease occurs in cats as a result of inflammation of the renal tubules and the renal interstitial tissue without an identifiable cause (idiopathic tubulointerstitial nephritis). The main symptoms are a reluctance to eat, increased drinking, increased urine output, fatigue, vomiting and weight loss. Chronic kidney disease in cats is divided into four main stages based on the creatinine concentration in the blood plasma, which are further subdivided according to the protein-creatinine quotient in the urine and blood pressure. Treatment is mainly based on reducing the protein and phosphate content of the diet to the basic requirement ("renal diet"). In addition, the numerous secondary symptoms resulting from renal dysfunction, such as disorders of the water, electrolyte and acid-base balance, increased blood pressure, anemia and digestive disorders are treated with medication. If detected and treated early, the progression of the disease can be slowed, the quality of life improved and the life expectancy of the animals increased.

== Physiological basics ==
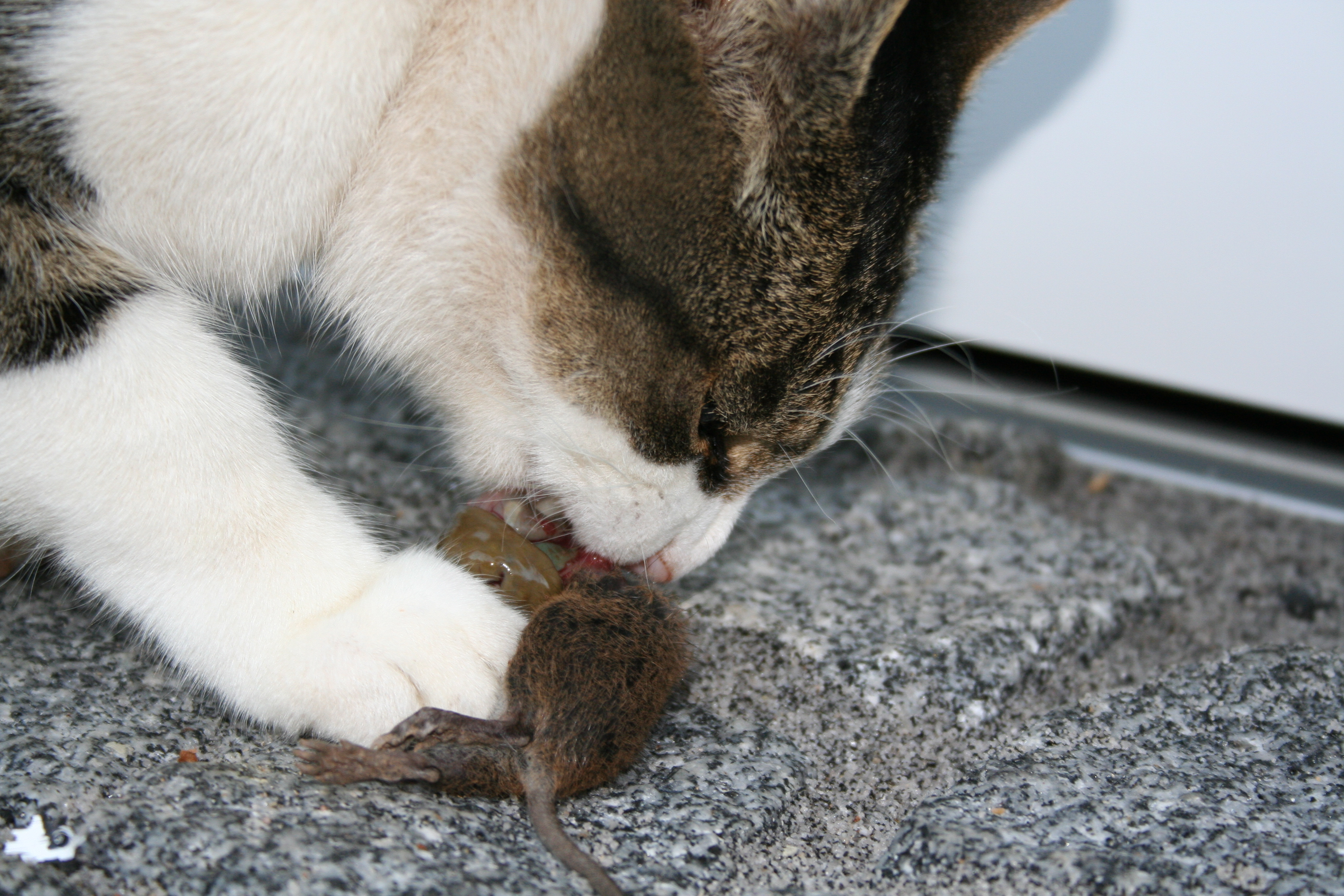
Cats are carnivores.

The kidney is a vital organ with a variety of responsibilities. It plays an important role in maintaining the water, electrolyte and acid-base balance. It excretes toxic metabolic degradation products such as urea. It also recovers valuable substances such as glucose, amino acids, peptides and minerals initially filtered out of the blood during ultrafiltration in the renal corpuscles. In addition, endogenous and exogenous substances are metabolized and broken down in the kidneys—the kidney is therefore a central metabolic organ alongside the liver. Finally, some hormone-active substances are secreted by the kidney, such as renin, erythropoietin and calcitriol (active form of vitamin D_{3}). As a result, the organ plays an important role in the regulation of blood pressure, new blood formation and the balance of calcium and phosphorus, and is thus crucial to bone metabolism, as well.

As carnivores, cats are particularly dependent on the intake of animal proteins because glucose formation from amino acids is their most important energy source. The enzymes of amino acid degradation are adapted to the high protein intake and their activity is largely independent of the protein supply in the diet, so that cats break down endogenous proteins (especially from the muscles) when there is a lack of protein intake (catabolic metabolic state). Meat and offal also contain vital nutrients for the cat, such as Vitamin A, Taurin or arachidonic acid. Compared to a normal human diet, cats consume around six times as much phosphate in their diet with standard cat food. This makes it difficult to achieve a similar phosphorus reduction in cat food as is aimed at in human medicine for human kidney diets.

== Pathophysiological basics ==
Basic transport processes in the nephron

Symptoms of the disease only appear at an advanced stage, when more than two-thirds of the original kidney function has already been lost. This is due to the body's own compensatory mechanisms and the kidney's reserve capacity, which can compensate for the reduced kidney function for a long time and maintain the excretion of urine-requiring substances. With the loss of functioning nephrons—the functional structural unit of the kidney—the filtering capacity of the renal corpuscles (glomerular filtration rate) decreases and with it the excretory capacity for urinary substances. Acute damage to the tubules can regenerate again if the basement membrane is preserved. However, if a section of the nephron is irreversibly damaged, the entire nephron dies.

The increased urea levels in the blood (uremia) lead to nausea and vomiting for various reasons. Firstly, they directly irritate chemoreceptors in the chemoreceptor trigger zone in the brain. Secondly, they increase gastrinsecretion and thus lead to an increase in gastric acid production and thus to hyperacidity of the stomach. Finally, they cause vascular inflammation (uraemic vasculitis), which leads to further damage to the digestive tract.

As a result of the accumulation of phosphate in the blood (hyperphosphatemia) and the reduced formation of calcitriol in the remaining main parts, there is a drop in the calcium blood level (hypocalcemia) and increased parathyroid hormone is released from the parathyroid gland. Chronic kidney disease leads to hyperparathyroidism in 84% of cases (secondary renal hyperparathyroidism). Among other things, the parathyroid hormone causes calcium and phosphate to be released from the bones, which ultimately leads to renal bone disorders and calcification of the kidneys, skin, heart and blood vessels. In the kidneys, this calcification contributes to further destruction of the kidney tissue. The reduced responsiveness of the parathyroid cells to calcium disrupts the negative feedback of parathyroid hormone secretion, so that parathyroid hormone continues to be secreted despite the increase in calcium levels. As less phosphate reaches the renal tubules due to the reduced filtration rate, the inhibitory effect of parathyroid hormone on reabsorption in the main body has only a minor effect on the blood phosphate level.

The loss of nephrons and the associated decrease in the number of sodium ion channels leads to a decrease in the concentration gradient in the kidney. However, this is the driving force for water reabsorption in the mid-piece and—in the presence of ADH—also in the collecting ducts. The result is a loss of water via the urine and thus drying out of the body, which is exacerbated by the loss of fluid during vomiting.

One consequence of the kidneys' reduced ability to excrete hydrogen ions, phosphate and sulphate and the excessive loss of bicarbonate is the metabolic acidification of the blood (metabolic acidosis). Metabolic acidosis occurs in 80% of cats with chronic kidney disease.

With increasing kidney damage, the autoregulation of renal blood flow, which normally ensures that the blood flow and thus the filtering capacity up to a threshold of 60 mm Hg are independent of the general blood pressure, is also impaired. As a result, kidney performance is reduced at low blood pressure and, in the case of high blood pressure often associated with chronic kidney disease, further damage occurs due to pressure overload of the renal corpuscles. The increase in blood pressure is due to hardening of the blood vessels in the area of the renal corpuscles, the reduced formation of vasodilating prostaglandins and activation of the renin-angiotensin-aldosterone system.

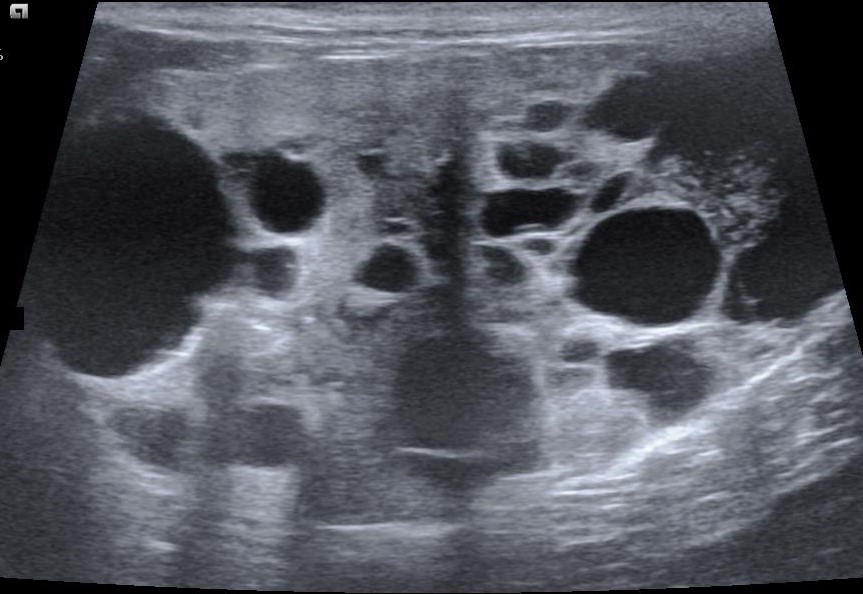
Cystic kidney in ultrasound image

== Occurrence and causes ==
Chronic kidney disease is one of the most common causes of death in older domestic cats. In many animals, however, the disease initially remains unrecognized, as clinical symptoms are often absent in the early stages of chronic kidney disease due to the kidney's reserve capacity and sufficiently sensitive diagnostic tests are not available for routine use. The data on the frequency of the disease in cats is contradictory, varying between 1.6 and 20%. Chronic kidney disease occurs more frequently in older cats: Over 50% of affected cats are seven years old or older and 30% of all cats over 9 years of age show elevated blood levels of nitrogen compounds (azotemia). However, the disease can occur as early as 9 months of age. Disposition predisposition has been proven for Maine Coon, Abyssinian, Siamese, Russian Blue and Burmese.

Since the kidneys have a high reserve capacity and clinical symptoms only appear when two thirds of the original kidney function has been lost, the triggering factors must damage both kidneys.

Chronic kidney disease in cats is an idiopathic tubulointerstitial nephritis, i.e. an inflammation of the renal tubules and the renal interstitial tissue without an identifiable cause. In addition to the damage that this primary disease causes directly to the kidney tissue, activated endogenous repair mechanisms such as connective tissue formation lead to further, partially self-sustaining destruction of functional kidney tissue. The reduced ability of the kidneys to excrete sodium and water causes retention (medicine) of these substances and thus an increase in blood volume, which ultimately leads to an increase in blood pressure. About two thirds of all cats with CNE are affected. High blood pressure in turn leads to increased connective tissue formation. A potassium deficiency or excess calcium secondary to other kidney damage also causes further damage to the kidney tissue.

Possible causes of chronic kidney failure in cats
Cause	Remarks
Damage to the renal corpuscles
Chronic glomerulonephritis	Inflammation of the renal corpuscles
Glomerulosclerosis	"Hardening" of the renal corpuscles due to connective tissue formation
Damage to the renal tubules
idiopathic tubulointerstitial nephritis (CNE)	Inflammation of the renal tubules and the interstitial tissue of the kidney
Chronic pyelonephritis	Renal pelvic inflammation with involvement of the kidney tissue
Nephrocalcinosis	Kidney damage due to excess calcium in the blood
Hypokalemic Nephropathy	Kidney damage due to a lack of potassium in the blood
granulomaatous nephritis	Nodular inflammation of the kidneys, in cats mainly as a result of feline infectious peritonitis (FIP)
Kidney tumors	mainly malignant lymphoma, other tumors such as kidney cancer, transitional cell carcinoma, nephroblastomas and hemangiosarcomas do not usually occur on both sides
Nierenamyloidose	Pathological protein deposition, more frequent in Abyssinian cat and black-footed cats
Polycystic kidney disease	Hereditary cystsformation in Persian cats
Damage to the urinary tract
kidney stones	Deposits of concrements in the urinary tract
Hydronephrose	"Water-sac kidney" due to urinary retention
perirenal circumferential augmentation	only if bilateral: cysts, bruising, pseudocysts and other space-occupying processes in the vicinity of the kidney
Kidney worm infestation	Infection with Dioctophyma renale, rare and only in southern Europe, Asia and North America
Damage as a result of vascular diseases
Arterial hypertension	General high blood pressure
Glomerular hypertension	High blood pressure in the area of the renal corpuscles
Disseminated intravascular coagulopathy	Blood clotting within the blood vessels

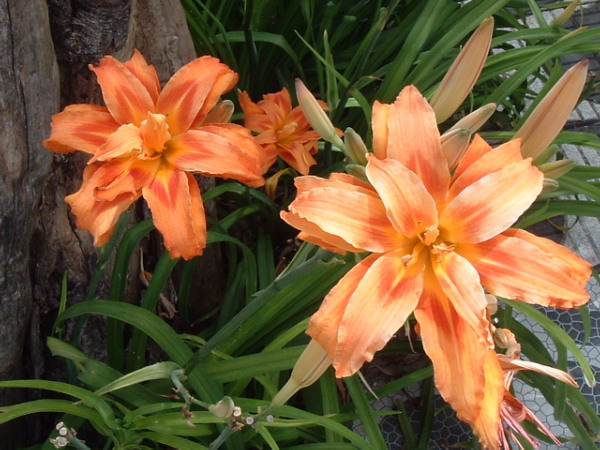
The yellow-red daylily—a popular ornamental plant with high kidney toxicity in cats

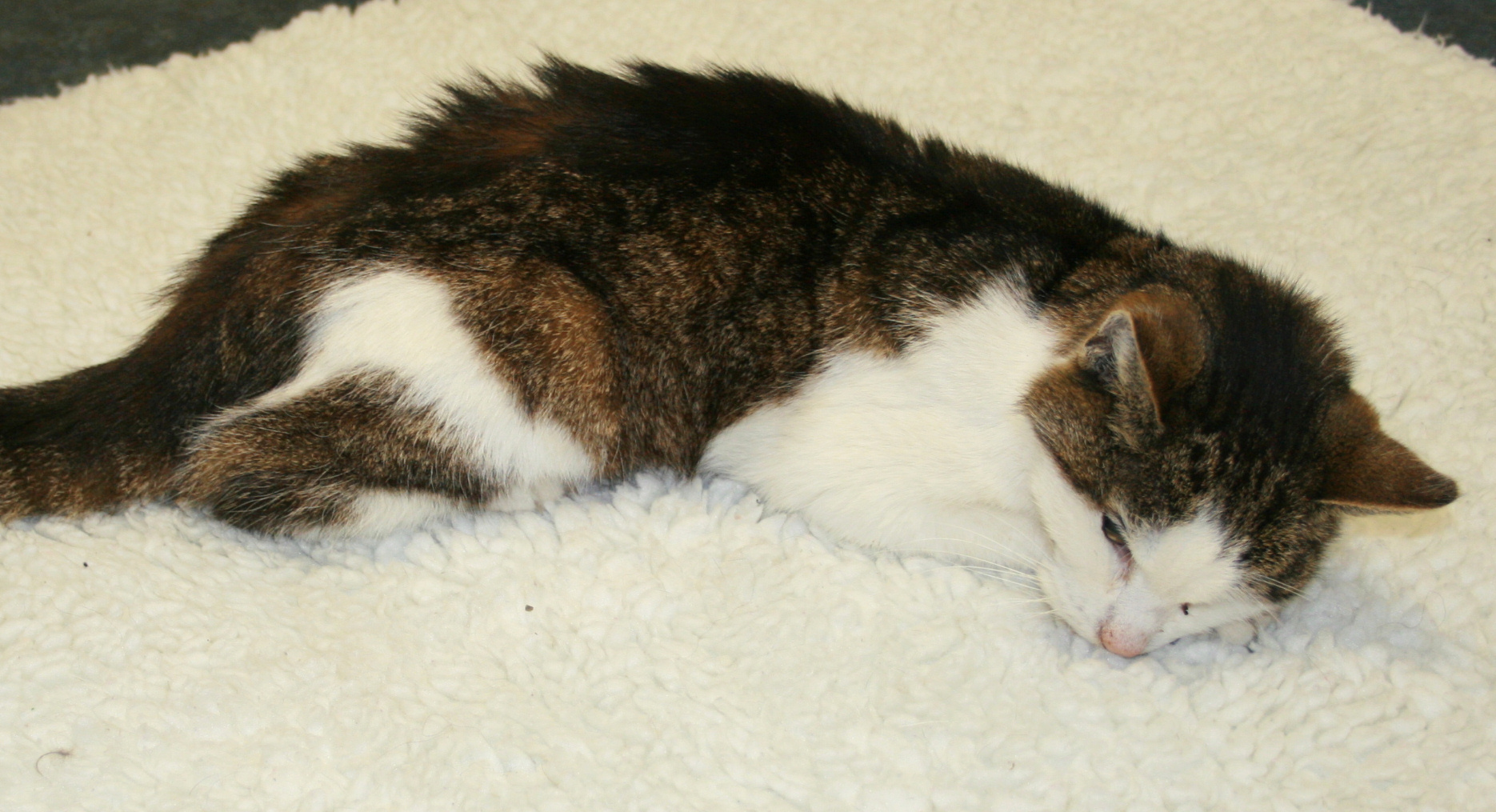
Unresponsive cat with poor general condition—typical of chronic kidney disease

Other diseases can also be triggers of renal dysfunction, for example infections, autoimmune diseases, poisonings or tumors. Virtually any infection or even lupus erythematosus can lead to the deposition of antigen-antibody complexes in the basal membrane of the renal corpuscles and thus to their damage. Many lily species, ethylene glycol, melamine, cyanuric acid and some heavy metals (cadmium, lead, mercury) have a strong toxic effect on the kidneys (renal toxicity) in cats. But also many drugs such as amphotericin B, cholecalciferol, doxorubicin, polymyxins, aminoglycosides and numerous non-steroidal anti-inflammatory drugs (→ analgesic nephropathy) can cause kidney damage.

== Symptoms ==
The main symptoms of chronic kidney disease in cats are lack of appetite (anorexia), increased drinking (polydipsia), increased urine output (polyuria), fatigue (apathy), vomiting and weight loss. In addition, diarrhea, inflammation of the oral mucosa (stomatitis) with the formation of ulcers (ulcera), increased salivation (hypersalivation) and bad breath may occur as a result of uremia. Increased blood pressure (arterial hypertension) with damage to the eye (fundus hypertonicus, hypertensive retinopathy), anemia (anemia), itching, dehydration, soft tissue calcifications, bleedings and accumulation of water in the tissues (oedemas) are also more frequent accompanying symptoms. In the case of severe uremia, neurological neurology manifestations such as apathy, seizures, delirium, coma, abnormal movements and muscle disorders (myopathies). Typically, the symptoms—in contrast to acute renal failure—occur gradually over weeks, months or even years, and the general condition is poor. In addition, acute kidney failure is initially characterized by reduced urine production. However, an existing mild or moderate chronic kidney disease is often suddenly worsened by an acute event ("exacerbation") and thus becomes conspicuous to the cat owner. This can be the case, for example, if one kidney has already become a non-functioning shrunken kidney due to urinary retention and the second suddenly swells acutely due to urinary retention (hydronephrosis) and is damaged ("large kidney-small kidney syndrome") or if hyperthyroidism is treated and the glomerular filtration rate is suddenly reduced as a result.

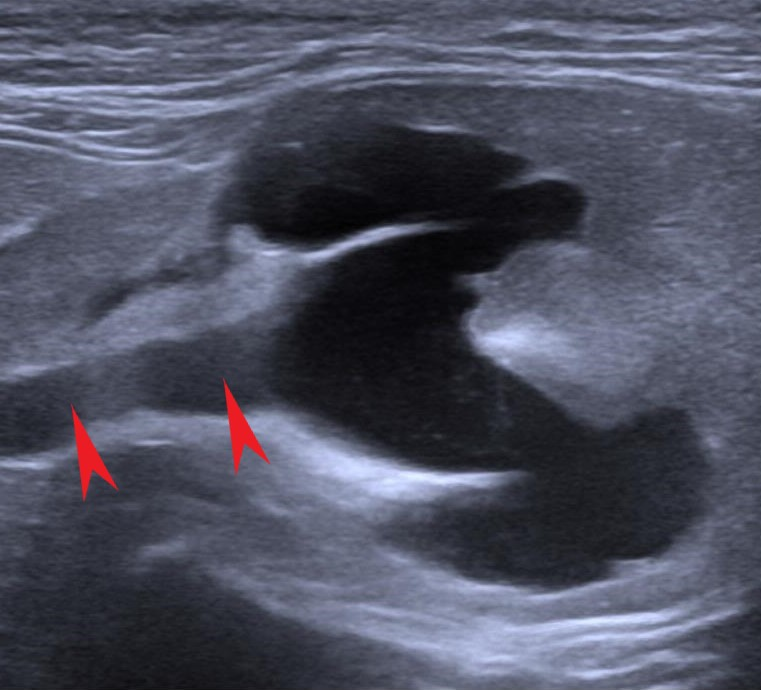
Ultrasound image of hydronephrosis in a cat. The arrows point to the dilated ureter.

By palpation, the kidneys can be checked for pain, firmness (consistency), enlargement or reduction in size and changes in surface structure. A healthy kidney is about 4 cm long, 3 cm wide and 2–3.5 cm thick. In the most common form—CNE due to tubulointerstitial nephritis—the kidneys are usually reduced in size and have an irregular surface; in the case of tumors or pyelonephritis, they may be enlarged and sensitive to pain. Since the degree of protein loss via the urine is directly related to the increase in blood pressure, regular blood pressure measurement is advisable.

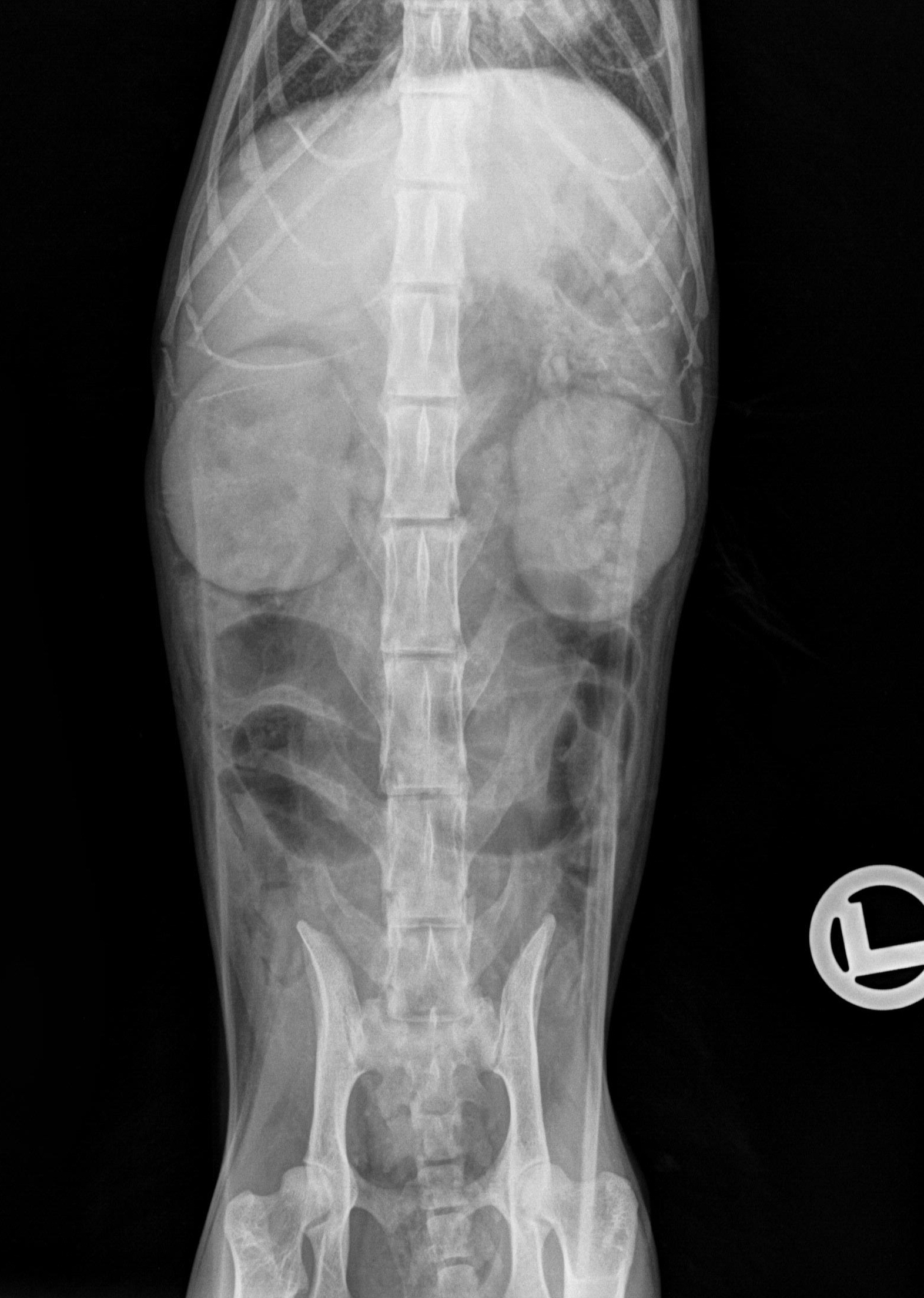
Urography: Diffuse accumulation of contrast medium in the kidneys of a cat with high-grade CNE

An X-ray examination can be used to detect changes in the size, density and position of the kidneys as well as some urinary stones (struvite and calcium oxalate stones are "radiopaque") and soft tissue calcifications. In severely emaciated cats or fluid accumulations in the retroperitoneal space, however, the kidney can only be visualized to a limited extent on the X-ray image due to the resulting reduction in contrast. Excretory urography, in which a radiopaque contrast medium (e.g. Iopamidol, Iohexol) is injected into the bloodstream and its excretion via the kidneys is recorded radiographically. This makes it possible to detect circulatory disorders, dysfunctions of the renal corpuscles and obstructions of the outflow pathways.

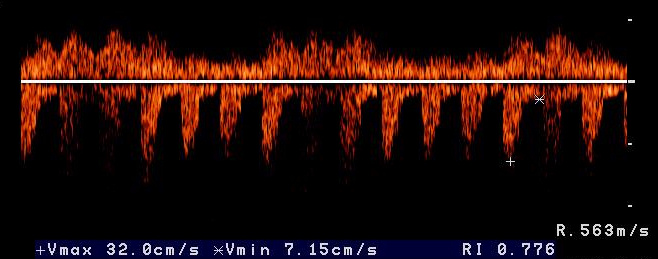
PW-Doppler: Increased resistance index

The ultrasound examination allows morphological changes in the kidneys in more detail. In addition to changes in size and shape, renal cysts, localized (focal) organ damage, water sac kidneys and urinary retention as well as tumors can also be visualized. Hardly defined (diffuse) organ changes are accompanied by changes in echogenicity, but can only rarely be assigned to defined diseases. Pulsed Wave Doppler" can also be used to detect circulatory disorders. Calcification (nephrocalcinosis) is also common in chronic kidney disease and can also be detected sonographically.

Renal biopsy is not routinely used, but may be indicated in certain preliminary reports—for example, young Abyssinian cats with symptoms of kidney disease for the detection of amyloidosis. Although computed tomography and magnetic resonance imaging have very good detail recognition, they only play a subordinate role in veterinary medicine due to their high costs and limited availability.

== Laboratory diagnostic findings ==
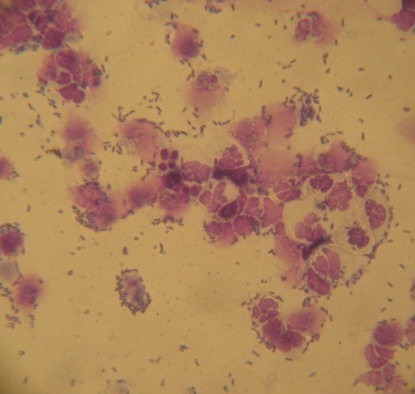
Bacteria in urinary sediment in a cat with pyelonephritis

Urinalysis is essential in chronic kidney disease in cats. Damage to as little as two thirds of the nephrons results in a reduced ability to concentrate urine and the specific weight falls below 1030 N-m^{−3}. Protein loss via the kidney is detected by an increase in the protein/creatinine ratio in the urine (UPC), as 24-hour collection samples are impractical in cats. The UPC is a good marker for the early detection of CNE, as it reveals renal dysfunction even before the creatinine in the blood rises. The urine sediment can also show effusions from the renal tubules (cylinder), and in chronic bacterial renal pelvic inflammation bacteria or pus can also be detected. The detection of small amounts of albumin (< 300 mg/l, "microalbuminuria") is very sensitive, but not very specific for chronic kidney disease.

Reference values of selected serum parameters in cats
Parameter	Reference range
creatine	< 170 μmol/L (< 2 mg/dL)
SDMA	< 14 μg/dL
Urea	5–11 mmol/L (30–65 mg/dL)
Phosphat	0,8–1,9 mmol/L
Calcium	2,3–3,0 mmol/L
Kalium	3,0–4,8 mmol/L
Natrium	145–158 mmol/L

In blood serum, the content of nitrogenous substances such as urea and creatinine (uremia or azotemia) and phosphate (hyperphosphatemia). The increased phosphate concentration is the result of the reduced glomerular filtration rate. Among other things, fibroblast growth factor 23 (FGF-23) is involved here, which is more sensitive than the phosphate level in the event of an incipient disorder. The potassium content is usually reduced (hypokalemia), but can also be increased—the reverse is true for the sodium content. If the cause of the kidney disease lies in the renal corpuscles, albumin deficiency (hypalbuminemia) and excess cholesterol (hypercholesterolemia) also occur. The determination of cystatin C is not evaluated for cats, this protein can also be elevated in cats with hyperthyroidism or with glucocorticoids and drop sharply for several hours after food intake. Recent studies suggest that symmetric dimethylarginine (SDMA) is a suitable marker for renal function in cats. The SDMA concentration in serum shows close correlations with the glomerular filtration rate and the creatinine concentration. It can already detect a 40% loss of kidney function, i.e. before there is an increase in creatinine in the blood.

The most sensitive method of kidney function diagnostics is the direct determination of the glomerular filtration rate via the clearance, which is already reduced in chronic kidney disease before azotemia occurs. Various substances have been evaluated for cats, the most practical being creatinine and iohexol. Although creatinine is eliminated more slowly than iohexol, it can be determined immediately in many veterinary practices photometric even without the involvement of a specialized laboratory.

In advanced kidney disease, the blood count shows a decrease in the number of red blood cells and thus the hematocrit without a change in the blood pigment load and the cell sizes of the red blood cells and without signs of new blood cell formation (normochromic, normocytic, aregenerative anemia).

== Classification ==
Chronic kidney disease in cats is currently divided into four main stages by the International Renal Interest Society (IRIS) and adapted by the European Society of Veterinary Nephrology and Urology, with the creatinine concentration in blood plasma being used as the main criterion. In addition, sub-stages are defined on the basis of the protein-creatinine quotient in the urine and blood pressure. The plasma creatinine concentration should be ensured by at least two measurements at intervals of one to two weeks, the protein-creatinine quotient in the urine by two or three measurements over a period of two to four weeks. As creatinine is also influenced by other factors, since 2019 the Symmetric dimethylarginine (SDMA) is also used for assessment. In diabetic cats SDMA may be reduced.

Stage	Plasma creatinine concentration	SDMA	Remarks
I	< 140 μmol/L (1,6 mg/dL)	<18 μg/dL	No azotemia, but other pathological kidney findings
II	140–249 μmol/L (1,6–2,8 mg/dL)	18–25 μg/dL	Low azotemia, clinical symptoms are weak or not pronounced at all in this area, residual kidney function approx. 33%
III	249–442 μmol/L (2,9–5,0 mg/dL)	26–38 μg/dL	Moderate azotemia, clinical manifestations are pronounced at this stage, residual renal function about 25%
IV	> 442 μmol/L (5,0 mg/dL)	> 38 μg/dL	Severe azotemia, usually accompanied by severe clinical symptoms, residual renal function < 10%

Sub-stage	Protein-creatinine quotient in urine	Remarks
a	< 0,2	No protein loss via the urine
b	0,2–0,4	Protein loss via urine questionable, should be confirmed by renewed measurements
c	> 0,4	Loss of protein via the urine (proteinuria)

Sub-stage	Blood pressure in mmHg (systolic: diastolic)	Remarks
1	< 150: < 95	Blood pressure without risk of organ damage
2	150–159: 95–99	Low risk of organ damage
3	160–179: 100–119	Medium risk for the occurrence of organ damage
4	> 180: > 120	High risk of organ damage

In stage 1, creatinine and SDMA values are still within the normal range. However, there are other disorders of kidney function, such as an inadequate ability to concentrate, protein loss via the urine, morphological kidney changes or an increase in the values on repeated measurements. Creatinine and SDMA values often indicate a different stage. This may be due to the biological fluctuation range, concomitant diseases, influencing factors outside the kidney and pre-analytical causes. In this case, staging should be based on the higher value and the determination should be repeated after two to four weeks.

== Differential diagnosis ==
In the sum of all examination findings, chronic kidney disease can hardly be confused with any other disease. There is only extensive agreement with acute renal insufficiency. Here, the clinical course (see symptoms) is particularly suitable as a differentiation criterion. In addition, in acute renal failure the blood pressure and red blood cell count are unchanged and the kidneys are often enlarged and painful.

The main feature that determines the staging—azotemia—can have a number of other causes that can be localized "before the kidney" (prerenal) or "after the kidney" (postrenal). Prerenal causes in cats are mainly blood loss, dehydration, shock, congestive heart failure, hyperthyroidism, but also fever or severe physical exertion. Possible postrenal causes include obstruction of the urinary tract due to bladder stones or tumors, tears of the urinary bladder, ureter, or urethra.

== Treatment ==
The options for kidney replacement therapy are severely limited in cats, as kidney transplants and hemodialysis in veterinary medicine are only carried out in exceptional cases due to the high equipment, logistical and financial costs involved. The aim is therefore to detect chronic kidney disease at the earliest possible stage, when the kidneys still have sufficient reserve capacity. At the same time, attempts are made to reduce the amount of urinary substances—especially nitrogen compounds and phosphate—in the diet by means of dietary measures. Finally, metabolic imbalances and sequelae must be buffered. From a plasma creatinine level of 7 mg/dL (618.8 μmol/L), however, drug therapy is not very promising.

=== Dietary measures ===
One problem with dietary therapy with phosphate—and protein-reduced diets is that they are usually not very palatable. In addition, cats with kidney disease have little appetite and getting used to a new food is made even more difficult due to the negative imprinting (behavior)—the cat associates its own physical discomfort with the new food. The loss of protein via the urine also results in a negative nitrogen balance, which also reduces appetite. Finally, affected animals often show gastrointestinal tract problems. In a clinical study by Elliott et al. 34% of cats could not be switched to the renal diet and in Plantinga et al. the figure was as high as 54%. An attempt can be made to increase the acceptability of the feed by warming it or by adding tasty additives such as tuna juice or sardines. It is therefore recommended to start the feed change only after the uraemia has been eliminated and to extend it over three weeks by gradually mixing it in to avoid feed aversion. Adsorbents such as activated charcoal or probiotics can be used in an attempt to reduce the formation of uraemic substances in the gastrointestinal tract. Cyproheptadine or mirtazapine may be used for a short time to increase appetite; if these measures do not work, force-feeding via an esophageal or gastric tube is necessary. The administration of feed supplements based on Chinese rhubarb or with prebiotics and probiotics had no discernible effect in clinical studies; there is only one small manufacturer's study on the activated charcoal-based absorber for indole in the large intestine (trade name Porus one), but this did not include any cats with kidney disease.

==== Phosphate reduction ====
A key goal in the management of chronic kidney disease in cats is to reduce dietary phosphate intake early in the course of the disease. As a rule of thumb, the phosphate content can be reduced to 170 mg/MJ UE (Megajoule metabolizable energy, see also Physiological calorific value), i.e. to two thirds of the maintenance requirement. Commercially available cat food usually contains twice the maintenance requirement and should therefore not be mixed with the diet food. If the phosphate levels in the plasma remain elevated despite the renal diet, absorption in the intestine can be reduced by using calcium salts and phosphate binders such as aluminum hydroxide, aluminum carbonate or lanthanum carbonate. Calcium carbonate can compensate for calcium deficiency in the early stages, but can lead to hypercalcemia in advanced stages. The use of phosphate binders should be monitored by blood tests and their dose adjusted on the basis of phosphate levels.

Several studies have shown that a reduction of phosphate in the diet is sufficient to slow down the progression of the disease. If the general condition continues to deteriorate during phosphate reduction, a phosphate deficiency should also be considered. This manifests itself in a similar way to chronic kidney disease: shaggy coat, loss of appetite, weakness, exhaustion and anaemia. Calcitriol can also be used to treat secondary hyperparathyroidism, but only if parathyroid hormone and calcium levels are monitored. For cats in the early stages with normal blood phosphate levels, a less phosphate-reduced diet ("Senior", "Early-Renal" or a mixture of kidney and normal food) is usually sufficient.

==== Protein reduction ====
In order to combat uraemia, the amount of protein in the diet and thus the amount of nitrogen supplied to the body can be reduced. However, this is only possible to a limited extent in cats, as their energy balance is dependent on protein (see above). The protein content should be adjusted to the maintenance requirement of 15 g digestible crude protein per MJ UE and should never be reduced below 11 g/MJ UE, whereby the amount of protein declared on feed must be multiplied by a factor of 0.86 to obtain the digestible crude protein. High-quality animal protein also reduces the amount of nitrogen compounds entering the large intestine and thus the amount of ammonia produced by bacterial degradation processes through the intestinal flora. If there are severe acceptance problems or there is a loss of body mass and muscle, complicating factors (metabolic acidosis, intestinal bleeding) must be clarified. The necessary nutritional requirements must be guaranteed in any case, in problematic cases even without a kidney diet.

=== Treatment of the accompanying symptoms ===
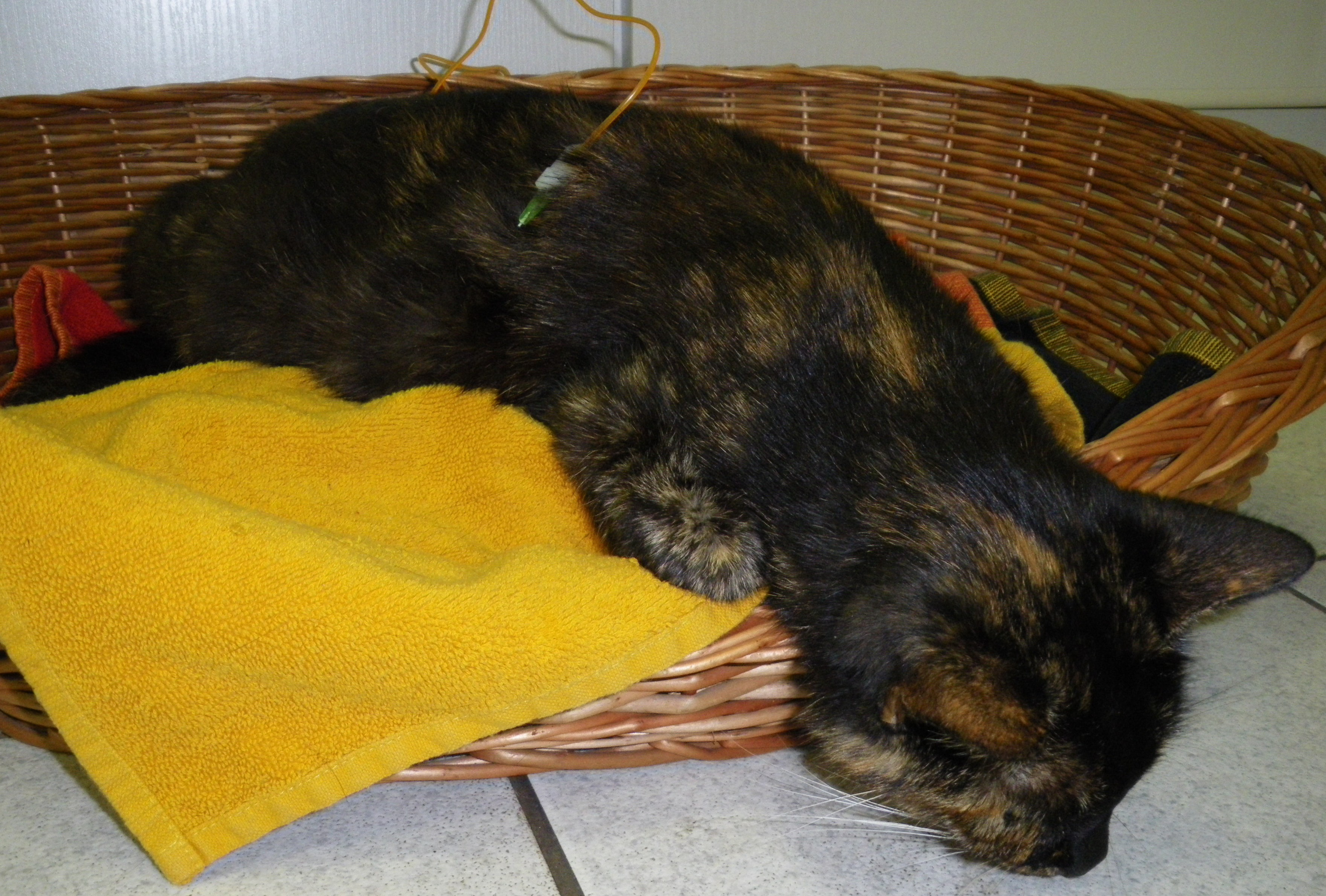
Subcutaneous fluid administration in a cat

==== Dehydration ====
To combat dehydration, sufficient fresh drinking water should be provided. Here, too, you can try to increase the cat's voluntary water intake by adding meat broth or tuna juice. Switching to wet food also often leads to increased fluid intake. Dehydrated cats or animals with volume deficiency require fluid administration with correction of electrolytes. Renal azotemia cannot be influenced in this way. The administration of sterile infusion solutions under the skin by the owner must be viewed critically. These also ultimately enter the vascular system and conventional infusion solutions inevitably lead to a permanent excess of sodium. This form of treatment should therefore only be carried out if the condition and hydration status improve and there are no disturbances in blood pressure or potassium levels. Infusion solutions for cats in stage IV should contain a maximum of 40 mmol/L sodium and about 13 mmol/L (max. 30 mmol/L) potassium (half-electrolyte solution with potassium substitution).

==== Metabolic acidosis and potassium ====
The bicarbonate content should ideally be between 17 and 22 mEq/L. Sodium bicarbonate or potassium citrate is administered for buffering, whereby the latter also compensates for any existing potassium deficiency. A diet rich in potassium and magnesium is recommended and is already used in most commercial kidney diets. Potassium gluconate can also be used to compensate for a potassium deficiency, but potassium chloride is usually poorly accepted by cats and often causes gastrointestinal disorders. The restriction of renal excretion in stage IV, ACE inhibitors or aldosterone deficiency due to renin deficiency can also lead to hyperkalemia, which is why potassium levels must be checked regularly and a low-potassium diet may also need to be used.

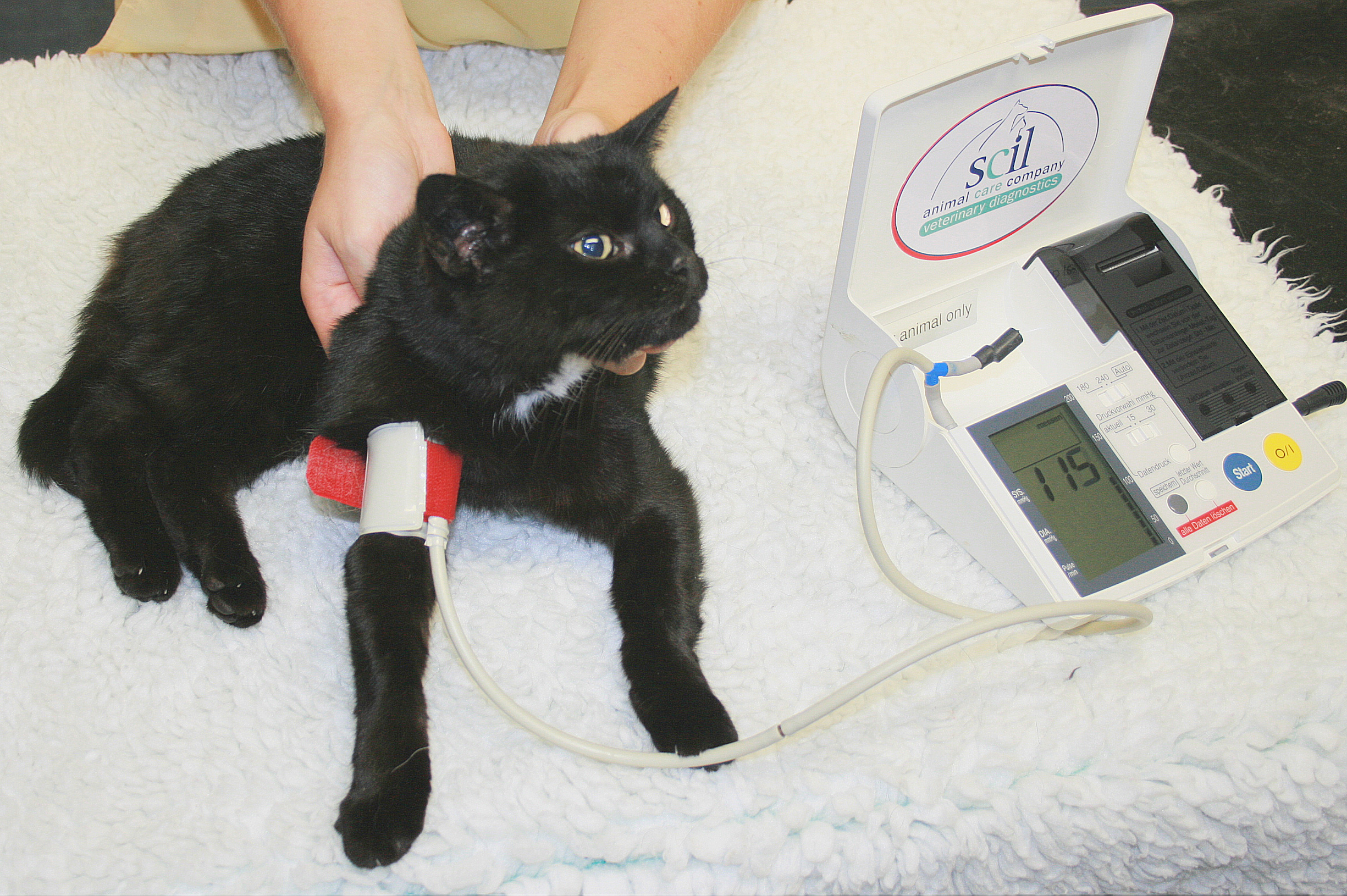
Blood pressure measurement in a cat

==== High blood pressure ====
Over 60% of cats with kidney disease develop high blood pressure. Amlodipine is the main drug used for treatment. If the antihypertensive effect is not sufficient, the AT1 antagonist, which has been approved for cats since 2014 telmisartan can also be used to treat high blood pressure and proteinuria. Telmisartan can significantly reduce the extent of proteinuria. However, the active ingredient can only be used as the sole antihypertensive agent if the blood pressure is below 200 mg Hg. It is important to monitor the effect of telmisartan at the beginning and after one week if the dose is changed by determining creatitinine, blood pressure and potassium levels; after four weeks, the urine protein-creatinine quotient should be checked. The reduction in systolic blood pressure must not be lowered below 120 mm Hg; it should be around 140 mm Hg. Telmisartan should also be discontinued in phases of volume or fluid deficiency, during acute episodes of illness or before anesthesia.

ACE inhibitors such as benazepril, enalapril or ramipril alone do not usually lead to a sufficient reduction in blood pressure, but they can slow down the progression of the disease up to stage III. In stage IV, ACE inhibitors are considered relatively contraindicated. Of these active substances, benazepril and ramipril are currently approved for cats in Germany, all others must be reclassified. Dietetically, the tendency to high blood pressure can be reduced by reducing the sodium content of the feed.

==== Anemia ====
To combat anaemia, an iron addition to the feed in the form of organic iron compounds or iron sulphate is particularly useful. The iron content in the feed should be slightly above the maintenance requirement of 5 mg/MJ UE. However, the parenteral administration of iron is more potent. If the hematocrit (Hct) nevertheless falls, blood transfusions are indicated. Anabolic steroids Steroids to increase new blood formation are slow-acting in cats and their benefit is questionable. recombinant human erythropoietin may be indicated from a hematocrit < 20%. However, the treatment is expensive and around a third of all cats form antibodies against this substance, which results in anemia that can no longer be treated. With darbepoetin, the risk of antibody formation is apparently significantly lower, it also has a longer plasma half-life and is more potent. Darbepoetin is used when the hematocrit is permanently below 20, the target range is a Hct of 25–35. This is usually achieved after two to three weeks, then the dose can be gradually reduced.

==== Gastrointestinal tract ====
Secondary consequences of uremia on the gastrointestinal tract in cats are mainly fibrosis and mineralization of the gastric mucosa, but no gastric ulcers, so that the gastric acid blockers such as omeprazole, which have long been recommended for therapy, are no longer indicated. Mirtazapine has been shown to stimulate the appetite and reduce uraemic nausea.

=== Kidney transplantation ===
Kidney transplantation is only possible in a few specialized facilities and is cost-intensive. The basic requirements are decompensated renal insufficiency at an early stage that no longer responds to conventional treatment, a previous weight loss of no more than 20%, the absence of serious concomitant diseases and negative tests for chronic viral infections such as feline leukemia or feline immunodeficiency syndrome. Urinary tract infections should also not have occurred in the recent past.

== Interactions with other treatments ==
Since the kidney is also an important excretory organ for numerous drugs, chronic kidney disease must be taken into account in the drug therapy of other diseases. For example, the plasma half-life may be significantly prolonged (e.g. with numerous antibiotics) and the dose must be reduced accordingly. Drugs that can only be administered with caution in cats with kidney disease include atenolol, carbimazole, chlorothiazide, digoxin and thiamazole.

== Treatment prospects ==
It is not possible to restore lost nephrons, so that all therapeutic measures only result in an increase in quality of life and lifespan. The treatment prospects is strongly dependent on the degree of azotemia, protein loss via the urine, hyperphosphatemia and uremia as well as the hematocrit. In stage 2, a low hematocrit and a high urine protein-creatinine ratio, and in stage 3 hyperphosphatemia are prognostic for progression of CNE. A new prognostic parameter is fibroblast growth factor 23, as it indicates an early derailment of mineral metabolism. The average survival time in a recent study was 1151 days in stage IIb cats, 778 days in stage III and only 103 days in stage IV. The consistent use of phosphate-reduced kidney diets shows quite good results up to stage III. If the measures taken do not work, the only option for advanced kidney disease is often euthanasia.

== See also ==
- List of feline diseases
