= TCP (antiseptic) =

Mild antiseptic introduced in 1918

200ml TCP bottle

TCP is a mild antiseptic, produced in France by Laboratoires Chemineau in Vouvray and sold in the United Kingdom by Omega Pharma. Introduced in 1918, the brand name comes from the chemical name of its original active ingredient trichlorophenylmethyliodosalicyl.

The liquid formulation is widely known for a strong medicinal odour characteristic of chlorinated disinfectants.

== History ==
TCP was introduced in 1918. Trichlorophenylmethyliodosalicyl was replaced as the active ingredient by a mixture of phenol and halogenated phenols in the 1950s.

Omega Pharma acquired the rights to TCP from Pfizer in 2004.

== Forms ==
As of October 2013, TCP was available in 50-millilitre (1.8 imp fl oz; 1.7 US fl oz), 100 ml (3.5 imp fl oz; 3.4 US fl oz), 200 ml (7.0 imp fl oz; 6.8 US fl oz) and 500 ml (18 imp fl oz; 17 US fl oz) bottles as a clear yellow liquid. A TCP throat lozenge is also available. TCP was available formerly as an ointment, TCP Original Antiseptic Ointment 30 g.

A spray plaster was or is available under the TCP brand.

== Uses ==
The instructions on the TCP bottle state that TCP can be used for sore throats, mouth ulcers, cuts, grazes, bites and stings, boils, spots and pimples.

It can also be used as a mouthwash when diluted, and can also be used as a general disinfectant.

== Harmful effects ==
Published advice states that TCP should not be swallowed, and recommends drinking plenty of water if 30ml or more of TCP is swallowed, and seeking medical advice if discomfort persists. Phenolic compounds such as those in TCP are harmful to cats.

== Ingredients ==
TCP Liquid's active ingredients are halogenated phenols and phenol. One source says each millilitre (0.04 imp fl oz; 0.03 US fl oz) of TCP antiseptic contains, chlorinated phenols 6 milligrams (0.093 grains); phenol 1.75 mg (0.0270 gr); iodinated phenols 0.95 mg (0.0147 gr); sodium salicylate 0.5 mg (0.0077 gr). It also contains glycerol, concentrated phosphoric acid, Quinoline Yellow WS and water. Formerly, when the product was manufactured by Unicliffe Ltd, the bottle label's list of ingredients stated, referring to the solution of halogenated phenolic bodies, "with partial elimination of the ionisable halides".

== See also ==
- Bactine
- Dettol
- Germolene
- Savlon
