= Intestinal cancer in cats and dogs =

Disease of cats and dogs

The average age at which intestinal tumors are diagnosed ranges between 10–12 years for cats and 6 to 9 years for dogs. There are many different types of intestinal tumors, including lymphoma, adenocarcinoma, mast cell tumor, and leiomyosarcoma.

== Signs and symptoms ==
The symptoms can vary but include weight loss, diarrhea, vomiting, and anorexia.

== Diagnosis ==
The veterinarian will typically perform a series of tests such as blood tests and imaging studies. The most definitive way to confirm/rule out intestinal tumors is to perform a medical procedure called endoscopy to visualize the organ and do a tissue biopsy.

== Treatment ==
Surgical treatment remains the treatment of choice for cats and dogs diagnosed with intestinal tumors who are in otherwise good health.
