= Bone cancer in cats and dogs =

Condition in veterinary medicine

The most common bone tumor is called osteosarcoma, and typically affects middle-age to older dogs of large and giant breeds. Osteosarcoma is less common in cats. Osteosarcoma is an aggressive cancer that can develop in any bone of the body but the majority is seen in the limbs (e.g. long bones such as radius, humerus, femur, and tibia).

== Signs and symptoms ==
Dogs with limb osteosarcoma typically show lameness and swelling at the affected site. For other sites, dogs may show difficulty to open their mouth (if jaw bone cancer), nasal discharge (if nasal cavity bone cancer) or neurological signs (if spine bone cancer).

== Diagnosis ==
The initial evaluation involves radiographs (X-rays) of the affected site, but the only way to confirm the diagnosis is by sampling the tissue via biopsy or needle aspiration.

== Treatment ==
Depending on the pet's unique condition, there are several treatment options, including surgery, chemotherapy and radiation therapy. Treating the pain adequately is also of crucial importance to improve the pet's quality of life, especially if amputation is not performed.
