= Bladder cancer in cats and dogs =

Bladder cancer in cats and dogs usually is transitional cell carcinoma, which arises from the epithelial cells that line the bladder. Less often, cancer of the urinary bladder is squamous cell carcinoma, adenocarcinoma, or rhabdomyosarcoma.

== Signs and symptoms ==
The most frequent symptoms of transitional cell carcinoma are blood in the urine, painful urination, frequent urination and/or straining to urinate. This can look very similar to an infection of the urinary system.

== Diagnosis ==
Diagnostic tests typically include complete blood tests, urinalysis, urine culture, X-rays of the abdomen and chest, and bladder imaging. The definitive diagnosis of bladder cancer will require a tissue biopsy and subsequent examination of the cells under the microscope.

== Treatment ==
Because most bladder cancers are invasive into the bladder wall, surgical removal is usually not possible. The majority of transitional cell carcinomas are treated with either traditional chemotherapy or nonsteroidal anti-inflammatory drugs.

== Epidemiology ==
Compared to other breeds of dog, Scottish Terriers have a much increased risk of developing transitional cell carcinoma.
