= Liver cancer in cats and dogs =

Tumors that develop within the liver may be either benign (noncancerous) or malignant (cancerous). Tumors can start in the liver, or spread to the liver from another cancer in the body. Malignant liver tumors have been reported to metastasize to other organs such as regional lymph nodes, lungs, kidneys, pancreas, spleen and others.

== Signs and symptoms ==
Clinical signs are often vague and include weight loss, loss of appetite, fatigue, and possible jaundice.

== Diagnosis ==
Medical imaging techniques such as X-rays, ultrasound, computed tomography (CT), and magnetic resonance imaging (MRI) are often used in evaluating animals with suspected liver tumors. Ultrasound-guided fine-needle aspiration or needle-core biopsy of liver masses are useful diagnostic tools that are minimally invasive to obtain samples for histopathological analysis.

== Treatment ==
Surgical treatment is recommended for cats and dogs diagnosed with primary liver tumors but not metastasis to the liver. There are not many treatment options for animals who have multiple liver lobes affected.
