= Feline acne =

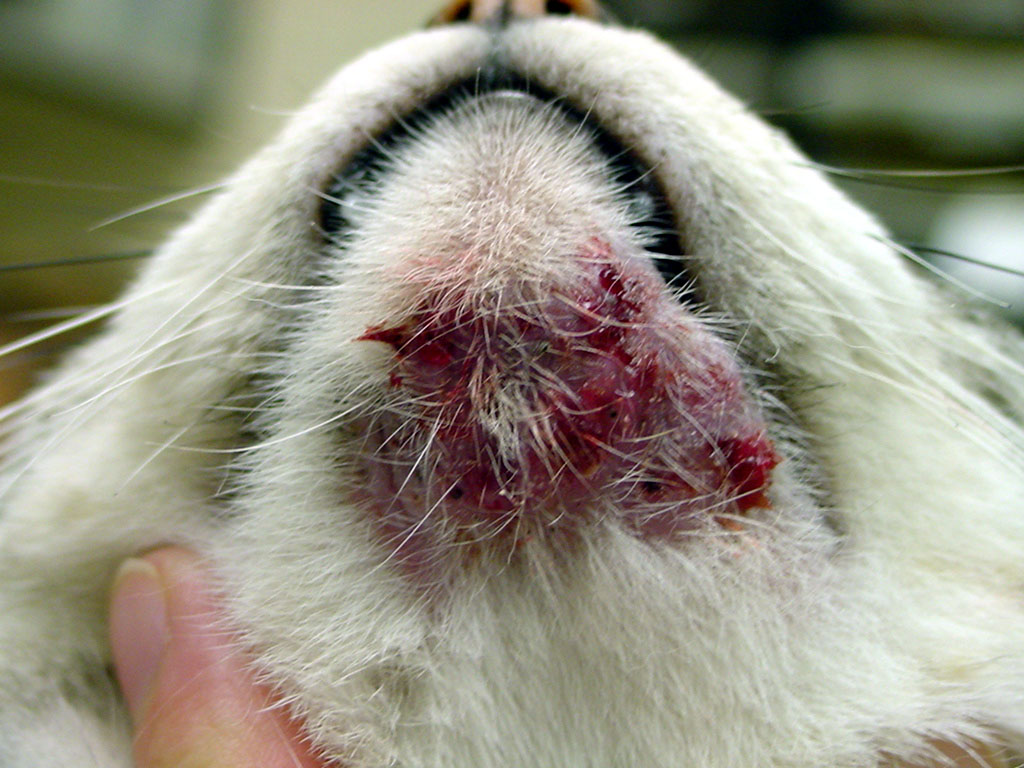
- Advanced feline acne
- Specialty: Veterinary medicine

Feline acne is a problem seen in cats primarily involving the formation of blackheads accompanied by inflammation on the cat's chin and surrounding areas that can cause lesions, alopecia, and crusty sores. In many cases, symptoms are mild and the disease does not require treatment. Mild cases will resemble dirt on the cat's chin, but the "dirt" will not be brushed off. More severe cases, however, may respond slowly to treatment and seriously detract from the health and appearance of the cat. Feline acne can affect cats of any age, sex, or breed, although Persian cats are also likely to develop acne on the face and in the skin folds. This problem can happen once, reoccur, or persist throughout the cat's life.

Sebaceous glands are skin glands that produce oil and are mostly found in the skin of the chin, at the base of the tail, and in the eyelids, lips, prepuce, and scrotum. They are connected to hair follicles. In acne, the skin pores become clogged with black sebaceous material, forming comedones (also known as blackheads). Comedones can become irritated, swollen, infected, and ultimately pustules. These may elicit itching and discomfort due to swelling and bacterial growth inside infected glands. Bacterial folliculitis occurs when follicles become infected with Staphylococcus aureus and is commonly associated with moderate-to-severe feline acne. Secondary fungal infections by Malassezia may also occur.

Other conditions that can cause similar-appearing conditions include skin mites, ringworm, yeast infection, or autoimmune diseases such as the eosinophilic granuloma complex ("rodent ulcers"). These can be ruled out by a simple biopsy of affected cells.

Feline acne is one of the top five most common skin conditions that veterinarians treat.

== Causes ==
Although the exact cause of feline acne is unknown, some causes include:

- Hyperactive sebaceous glands
- Poor hygiene
- Stress
- Developing secondary to fungal, viral, and bacterial infections
- Reaction to medication
- Eating or drinking from plastic containers. While it has commonly been suggested that cats are "allergic" to these containers, recent research suggests that plastic containers harbour bacteria due to irregular surfaces.
- Demodicosis or mange, causing itchiness and hair loss
- Suppressed immune system
- Hair follicles that don't function properly
- Rubbing the chin (to display affection or mark territory) on non-sanitized household items
- Hormonal imbalance

Obese cats which have difficulty grooming themselves are predisposed to dry, flaky skin and feline acne.

== Treatment ==
Topical treatments such as warm compresses to the chin area may be sufficient for mild cases. Veterinary intervention may be required for treatment if a secondary infection occurs. In this case, treatment may begin with clinical drainage of the pustules and a course of oral antibiotics.

Clearing the acne can be accomplished using an extra-soft bristled toothbrush or flea comb (one designated for this purpose) to brush the cat's chin. This will loosen debris and remove dried scabs. Epsom-salt compresses applied twice daily dry the affected area to relieve the inflammation and itchiness.

== Prevention ==
Placing the cat's water in a shallow dish may prevent the chin from absorbing the bacteria in the water while the cat is drinking. If the cat is allergic to plastics or dyes, using a stainless-steel or glass dish is recommended. Cats may also have food allergies that make the development of acne more likely, so that switching kibble or changing to a hydrolyzed diet may be effective. Maintaining good hygiene and grooming habits makes the development of feline acne less likely. Washing and exfoliating the chin with a gentle benzoyl-peroxide solution also may be preventive for further outbreaks.
