= Feline hyperaldosteronism =

Hormonal disorder in cats

Feline hyperaldosteronism is a disease in cats. The symptoms are caused by abnormally high concentrations of the hormone aldosterone, which is secreted by the adrenal gland. The high concentrations of aldosterone may be due directly to a disorder of the adrenal gland (primary hyperaldosteronism), or due to something outside of the adrenal gland causing it to secrete excessive aldosterone (secondary hyperaldosteronism).

== Causes ==
=== Primary hyperaldosteronism ===
Primary hyperaldosteronism (PHA) is a disorder of the adrenal cortex that causes increased circulating aldosterone levels. There are two types of PHA. One type is caused by a unilateral aldosterone-producing adenoma or adenocarcinoma. The other type, known as idiopathic hyperaldosteronism, occurs with bilateral adrenal hyperplasia.

=== Secondary hyperaldosteronism ===
Secondary hyperaldosteronism is a normal physiological response to decreased arterial blood volume, wherein hypovolemia activates the renin–angiotensin system to stimulate aldosterone synthesis and thus increase fluid retention.

== Mechanism ==
Aldosterone receptors are present on the epithelial cells of the distal nephron in the kidney. Aldosterone activates sodium channels that result in sodium resorption from the urine. Increased sodium and water retention results in systemic arterial hypertension. This increase in active sodium reabsorption generates an electrochemical gradient that leads to passive transfer of potassium from the tubular cells into the urine. This causes a lower total body concentration of potassium and potentially, hypokalemia. Hypokalemia affects polarization of nerve and muscle membranes, which causes episodic muscle weakness.

== Symptoms ==
Symptoms primarily relate to the effects of hypokalemia (potassium depletion) and systemic arterial hypertension (elevated blood pressure). As the disease progresses, affected cats will present muscular weakness and/or ocular signs of hypertension. Signs of muscle weakness can include a plantigrade stance of the hindlimbs, cervical ventroflexion, inability to jump, lateral recumbency, or collapse. Ocular signs of arterial hypertension include mydriasis, hyphema, or blindness due to retinal detachment and/or intraocular hemorrhages. A palpable mass in the cranial abdomen is another potential finding.

== Diagnosis ==
Persistently increased blood pressure may also be due to kidney disease or hyperthyroidism. When a cause is not readily apparent, and especially when hypokalemia is identified, hyperaldosteronism should be considered. Diagnostic imaging, usually beginning with abdominal ultrasound, may identify that one or both adrenal glands are enlarged. Imaging may also detect metastasis and usually includes radiographs of the chest in addition to abdominal ultrasound and/or computerized tomography (CT).

The ratio of plasma aldosterone concentration (PAC) to plasma renin activity (PRA) can be used as a screening test for PHA. In cats with unilateral or bilateral zona glomerulosa tumors, the PAC may be very high while the PRA is completely suppressed. In cats with idiopathic bilateral nodular hyperplasia of the zona glomerulosa, the PAC may be slightly elevated or high normal. In the presence of hypokalemia even a mildly elevated aldosterone should be considered inappropriately high. A high-normal or elevated PAC with a low PRA indicates persistent aldosterone synthesis in the presence of little or no stimulation of the renin–angiotensin system.

== Treatment ==
Unilateral primary hyperaldosteronism due to an adrenocortical adenoma or adrenocarcinoma can be potentially cured surgically. Unilateral adrenalectomy is the treatment of choice for unilateral PHA. Potential complications include hemorrhage and postoperative hypokalemia. With complete removal of the tumor, prognosis is excellent.

Bilateral primary hyperaldosteronism due to hyperplasia of the zona glomerulosa or metastasized adrenocortical adenocarcinoma should be treated medically. Medical therapy is aimed at normalizing blood pressure and plasma potassium concentration. Mineralocorticoid receptor blockers, such as spironolactone, coupled with potassium supplementation are the most commonly used treatments. Specific therapy for treating high blood pressure (e.g., amlodipine), should be added if necessary.

== Epidemiology ==
Most affected cats are over 10 years old. No breed or sex is predisposed to hyperaldosteronism.
