= Feline hepatic lipidosis =

Liver disease of cats

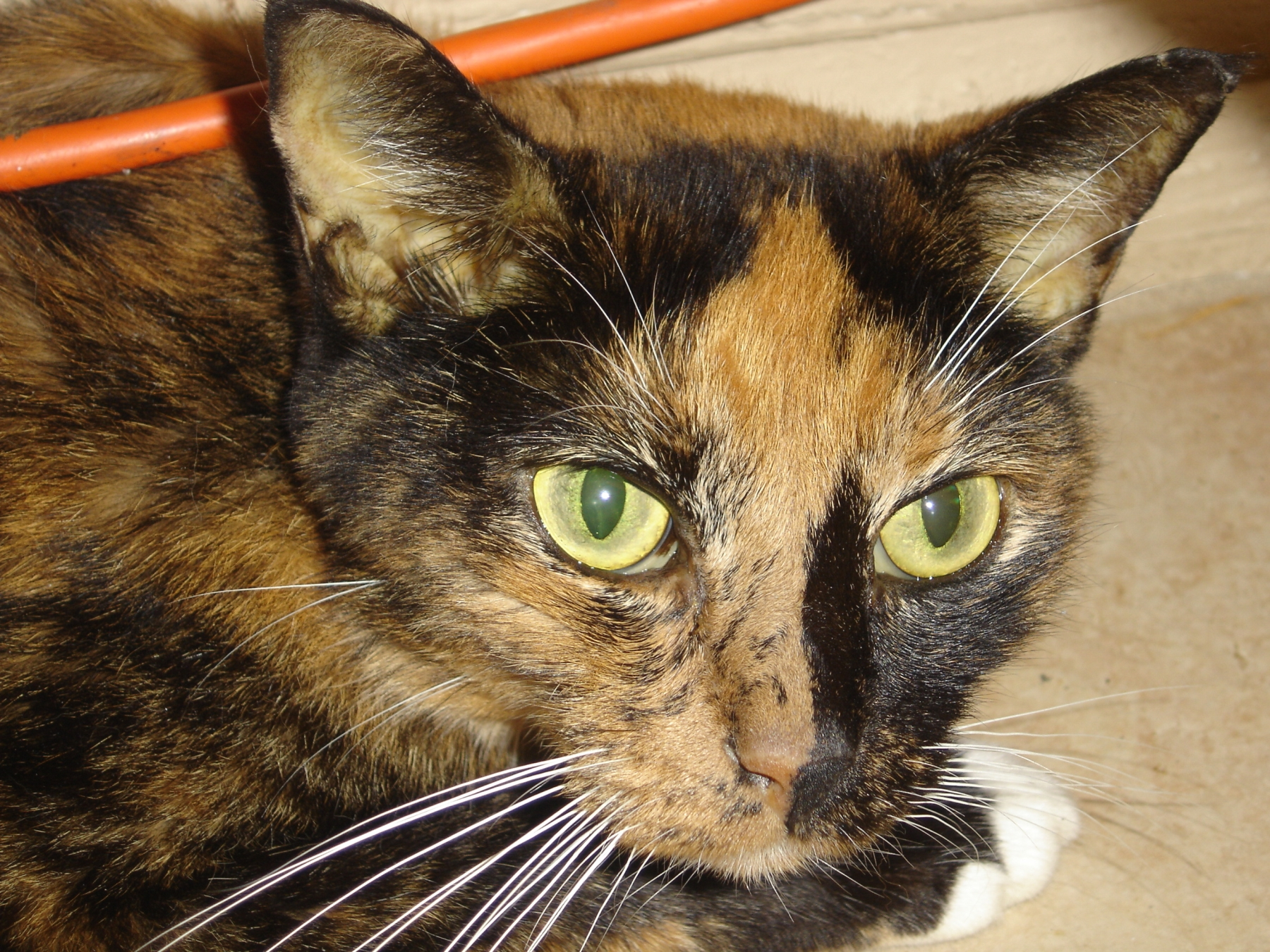
Cat with noticeable jaundice from late-stage hepatic lipidosis. Note the ears and eye-membrane

Feline hepatic lipidosis, also known as feline fatty liver syndrome, is one of the most common forms of liver disease of cats. The disease officially has no known cause, though obesity is known to increase the risk. The disease begins when the cat stops eating from a loss of appetite, forcing the liver to convert body fat into usable energy. If this process continues for too long, fat builds up in the cells of the liver, and the disease has officially onset. Prognosis varies depending on the stage of the disease, with both a high recovery and mortality rate at different stages. The disease is reversible through intense feeding. Treatment may involve the insertion of a temporary feeding tube to ensure adequate caloric intake for cats that have stopped eating as a result of this disease.

== Causes ==
One of the reasons a cat may stop eating is separation anxiety and the emotional stress that results. Moving, gaining or losing housemates or pets, going on vacation, or prolonged boarding are all common situations that pet owners report just prior to the onset of the disease, but it may develop without these conditions existing. Obesity is known to increase the risk of hepatic lipidosis; however, there is no known "official" cause of the disease. Severe anorexia (lack of appetite) usually precedes the onset of the disease. When the cat has no energy from eating, the liver must metabolize fat deposits in the body into usable energy to sustain life. The cat liver, however, is poor at metabolizing fat, causing a buildup of fat in the cells of the liver, leading to fatty liver. At this point the disease can be diagnosed; however, it will often not be diagnosed, and many animals are euthanized due to improper or no diagnosis.

== Symptoms ==
Anorexia always precedes liver disease, with the cat refusing to eat enough food for days, or weeks. This may be amplified by frequent vomiting when the cat does choose to eat. A lack of appetite causes the cat to refuse any food, even after it has purged its system of all stomach contents. Severe weight loss proceeds as the liver keeps the cat alive off body fat, causing a yellowing of the skin (jaundice). When the cat runs out of fat to process, severe muscle wasting (cachexia) takes place as the body converts protein into energy. Eventually the body cannot give the brain enough energy to function properly and the cat dies from malnutrition. In addition, an overworked liver can eventually fail causing total system collapse.

=== Early Stage ===
- Anorexia (lack of appetite)
- Vomiting

=== Late Stage ===
- Jaundice
- Seizures
- Drooling
- Coma

== Diagnosis ==
Feline hepatic lipidosis shares similar symptoms to other problems, including liver disease, kidney failure, feline leukemia, Feline infectious peritonitis, and some cancers. Diagnosis requires tests that target the liver to make an accurate diagnosis. Jaundice is highly indicative of the disease. Blood tests and a liver biopsy will confirm the presence of the disease.

== Treatment ==
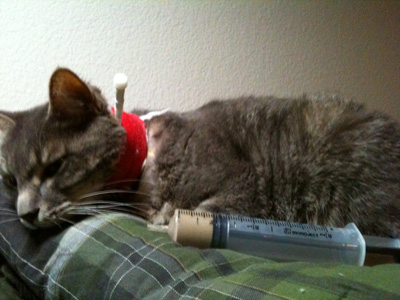
Cat receiving treatment for hepatic lipidosis. An esophageal feeding tube can be seen extending from the neck. A syringe containing a nutrient slurry can also be seen.

Untreated, the disease has a mortality rate upwards of 90%. Cats treated in the early stages can have a recovery rate of 80–90%. Left untreated, the cats usually die from severe malnutrition or complications from liver failure. Treatment usually involves aggressive feeding through one of several methods.

Cats can have a feeding tube inserted by a veterinarian so that the owner can feed the cat a liquid diet several times a day. If the cat stops vomiting and regains its appetite, it can be fed in a food dish normally. The key is aggressive feeding so the body stops converting fat in the liver. The cat liver has a high regeneration rate and the disease will eventually reverse assuming that irreparable damage has not been done to the liver.

The best method to combat feline hepatic lipidosis is prevention and early detection. Obesity increases the chances of onset. In addition, if a cat stops eating for 1–2 days, it should be taken to a vet immediately. The longer the disease goes untreated, the higher the mortality rate.
