= Cat flu =

Upper respiratory disease in cats

Cat flu, or feline upper respiratory disease, is a contagious disease complex (can include multiple pathogens) primarily caused by feline herpesvirus type-1 (FHV-1) and feline calicivirus (FVC), with secondary bacterial infections such as Bordetella bronchiseptica and Chlamydia felis sometimes contributing to clinical signs. Other common respiratory pathogens include Mycoplasma felis and Streptococcus zooepidemicus.

== Transmission and spread ==
Cat Flu is spread similarly to the "human flu" including:

- Direct contact such as playing, sleeping together, licking, or nuzzling
- Airborne droplets through coughing or sneezing which can reach another cat's eyes, nose, or mouth
- Contaminated surfaces such as food bowls, bedding, litter, or human hands

Even after recovery, many cats will remain carriers of the virus and have the potential to spread it to other cats. Newborn kittens can become infected due to their mother being a carrier of the virus.

Both cats and humans are susceptible to the virus, however the risk for humans is relatively low.

Cats infected with calicivirus continuously shed the virus, while those with feline viral rhinotracheitis (FVR) release it only occasionally. Stress can trigger the illness to return. The incubation period is about 2–6 days for FVR and calicivirus, and 5–10 days for pneumonitis.

== Clinical signs ==
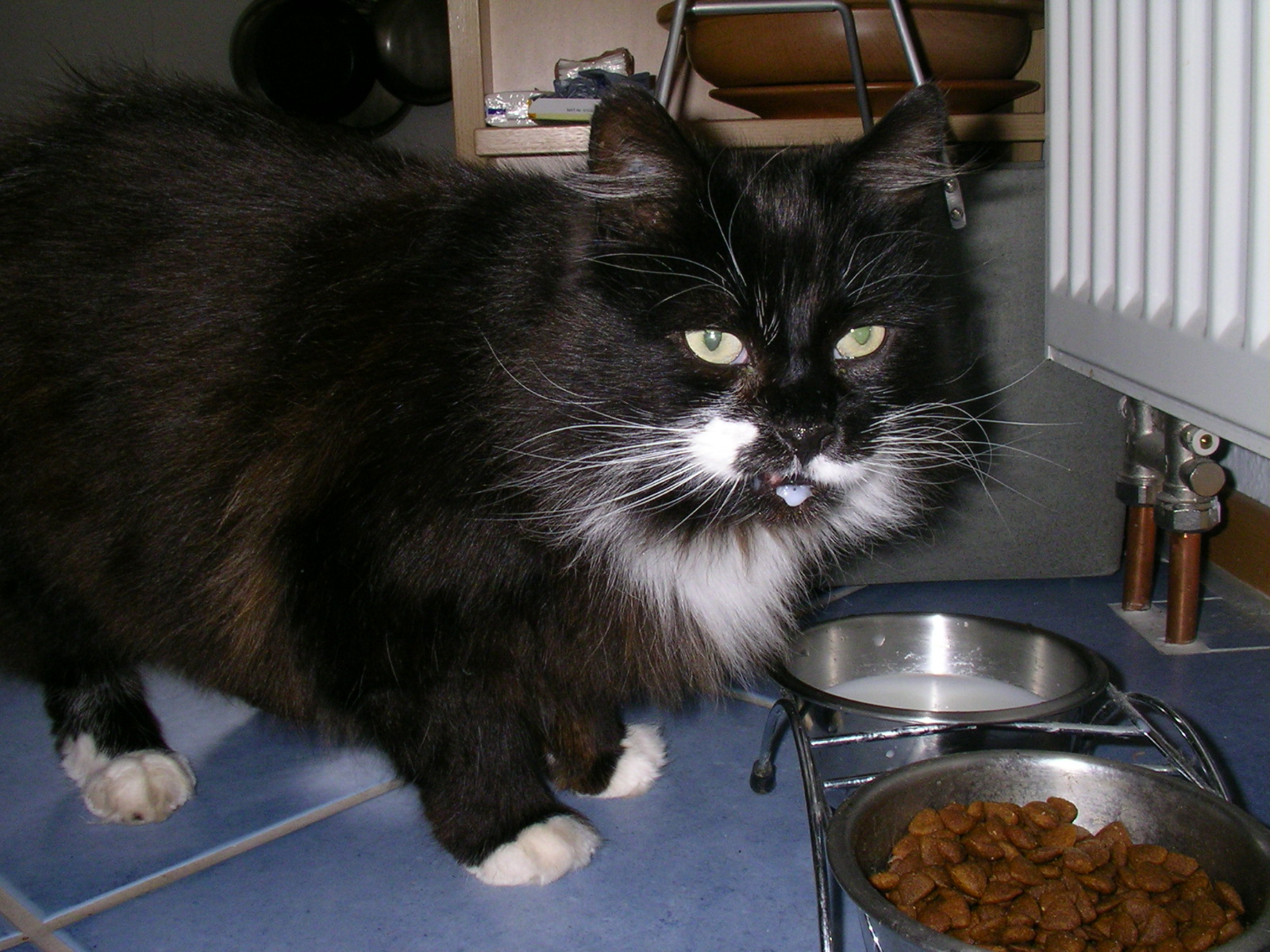
Cats with upper respiratory infections may avoid eating and drinking.

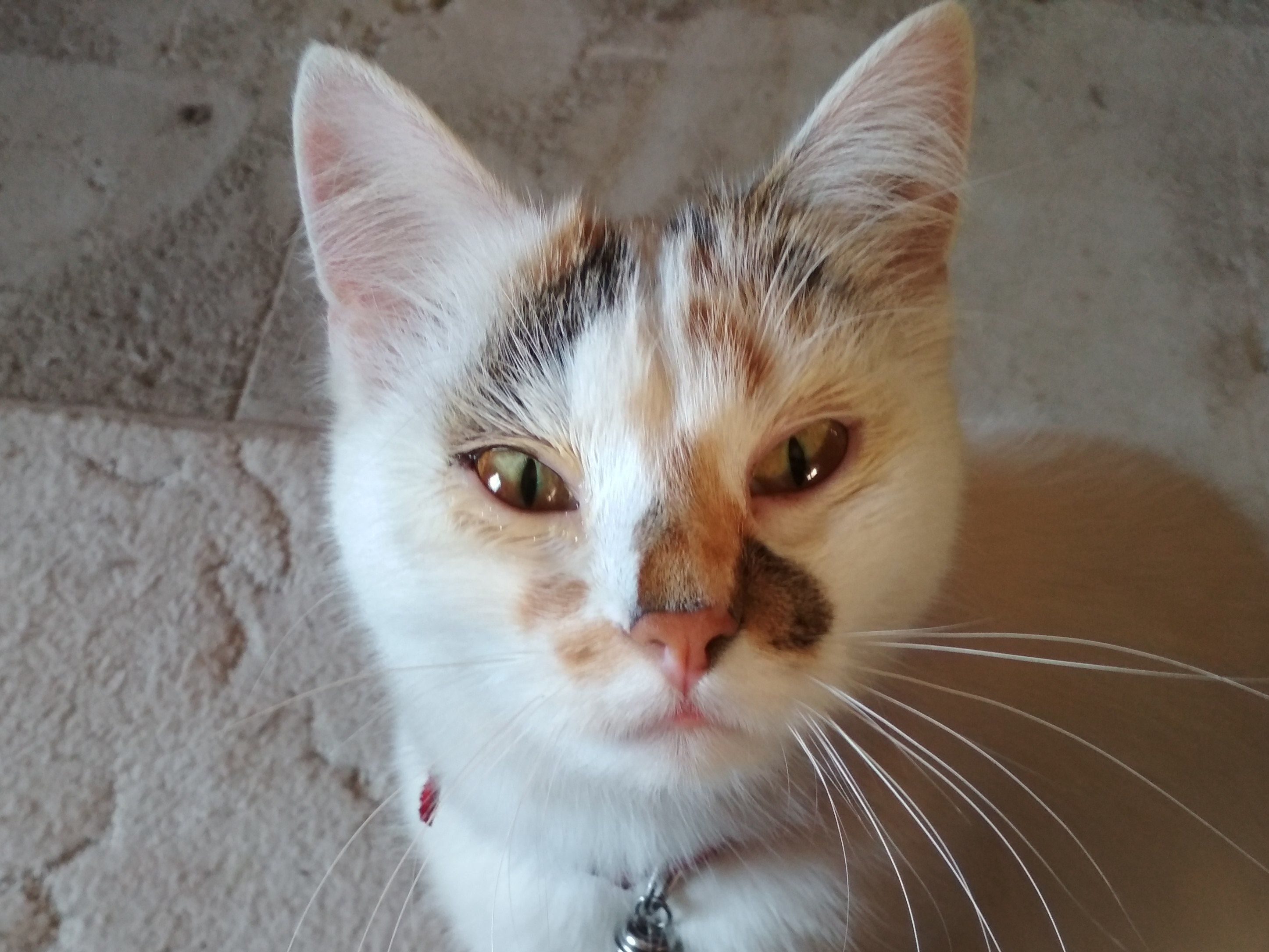
Feline chlamydia Infection

The viral infection in cats in usually mild, lasting 5-10 days with some cats remaining asymptomatic. More severe cases can last up to 6 weeks. Infected cats can exhibit the following symptoms:

- Sneezing
- Coughing
- Fever (up to 105 °F, 41 °C)
- Discharge from the nose or eyes
- Lethargy
- Fever
- Conjunctivitis
- Loss of appetite
- Neurological symptoms such as paralysis and seizures
- Oral ulcers

Severely infected cats can combat other complications including pneumonia, secondary bacterial infections, or even death when infected with highly pathogenic viruses like avian influenza A(H5N1).

== Diagnosis ==
Diagnosis can be unclear due to multiple infections occurring simultaneously. The beginning diagnosis of cat flu is based on typical signs such as sneezing, conjunctivitis, nasal discharge, tearing, drooling, oral ulcers, and difficulty breathing. Feline viral rhinotracheitis (FVR) mainly affects the eyes and nose while calicivirus targets the mouth and lower respiratory tract. Chlamydial infections often cause chronic, mild conjunctivitis.

Examination of Giemsa-stained conjunctival samples can help detect chlamydiae and mycoplasmas. A definitive diagnosis requires identifying the pathogen from samples taken from the mouth, nostrils, or eyes. Diagnosing FVR can be difficult because the virus is shed at irregular intervals and may be present in healthy cats as well as in sick ones.

When symptoms do not subside, veterinarians may run additional tests including chest x-rays, blood tests, or bacterial cultures.

== Treatment ==
Treatment for cat flu is mainly supportive, focusing on relieving symptoms and preventing complications. Antibiotics may be used to control secondary bacterial infections, including Chlamydia felis and Mycoplasma felis. Discharges from the nose and eyes should be cleaned regularly, and saline drops or nebulization can help remove mucus. Antiviral ointments and lysine supplements may be used for eye ulcers caused by FVR. Cats with severe breathing difficulties may require oxygen therapy, fluids for dehydration, or assisted feeding by feeding tube or syringe if they are not eating.

Other common home remedies include exposing the cat to warm, humid air (such as through a humidifier); gentle face washing to remove nasal discharge; and feeding the cat strong-smelling foods (due to the respiratory infections often impacting a cat's sense of smell, and by extension its appetite).

== Prevention ==
=== General hygiene ===
- Wash your hands with running water and soap, especially after:
  - Handling cats and their food and water dishes, and any supplies
  - Contact with cat saliva or feces
  - Cleaning the litter box
  - Outdoor gardening
  - Before eating and/or drinking
- Clean and/or change litter boxes daily
  - Immunocompromised people and pregnant women avoid cleaning litter boxes if possible due to increased risk and complications.
- Place litter boxes in areas away from other animals, children, and food preparation areas

=== Vaccination ===
To reduce the spread, veterinarians recommend vaccination of kittens.

These vaccinations are typically risk-based and are usually recommended for cats with increased risk exposure.

Vaccination against cat flu involves intranasal or parenteral vaccines targeting feline viral rhinotracheitis (FVR), feline calicivirus (FCV), and sometimes Chlamydia felis. Kittens older than 9 weeks are typically vaccinated twice, with a 3–4 week interval, and should receive follow-up doses until at least 12 weeks of age. Adult cats generally require revaccination every 1–3 years, with annual boosters recommended for cats at ongoing risk.

Vaccination, together with management of environmental factors such as minimizing exposure to sick cats, reducing overcrowding, and limiting stress, provides effective protection against feline upper respiratory disease.

=== Quarantine ===
Already-infected cats must usually be isolated from all other cats for at least two weeks, and all objects touched by the cat must usually be decontaminated afterwards, including litter boxes, food bowls, and human hands.

== Risk Factors ==
Cat flu is linked to stress from poor housing and crowding, particularly in shelters. Small cages, high densities, noisy environments, and long stays can increase stress, reduce ventilation, and make cats more susceptible to infection. The risk rises with each day in the shelter, and infections can prolong shelter stays, further increasing stress, resulting in a repeating cycle.

Mortality rates are generally low, and the chances of recovery are high, however, young kittens, older cats, and brachycephalic breeds are more susceptible. The disease can be persistent and may lead to significant weight loss. It is often complicated by secondary bacterial infections and, in some cases, has been associated with abortion.

== In society ==
In South Africa, the term cat flu is also used to refer to canine parvovirus; however, that illness primarily affects dogs, though other mammals such as cats, skunks, and foxes may be infected.

In the 2013 psychological horror film Escape from Tomorrow, there is a fictional strain of cat flu surrounding the Disneyland parks, which a Disneyland nurse claims one "could be a host [of] and not even know it". The main protagonist Jim later experiences these symptoms in the end of the film, such as constipation, vomiting up massive hairballs and blood, and gradual weakening of his body, before his wife discovers his corpse the next morning with cat eyes and a grinning face.
