= Kitten =

Juvenile cat

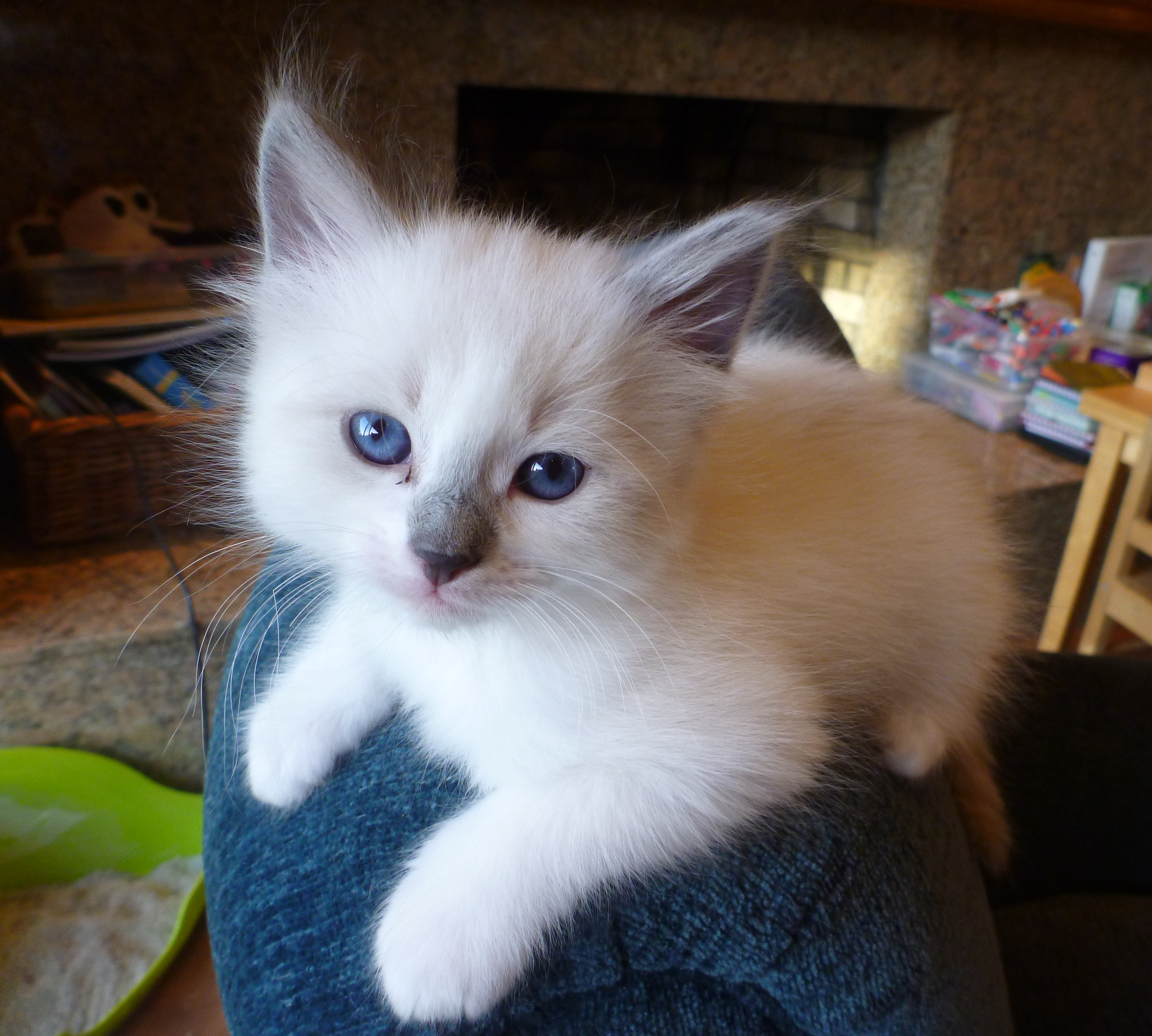
A Ragdoll kitten

A kitten is a juvenile cat. After being born, kittens display primary altriciality and are fully dependent on their mothers for survival. They normally do not open their eyes for seven to ten days. After about two weeks, kittens develop quickly and begin to explore the world beyond their nest. After a further three to four weeks, they begin to eat solid food and grow baby teeth. Domestic kittens are highly social animals and usually enjoy human companionship.

== Etymology ==
The word "kitten" derives from the Middle English word kitoun, which in turn came from the Old French chitoun or cheton. Juvenile big cats are called "cubs" rather than kittens. For the young of smaller wild felids, such as ocelots, caracals, and lynxes, either term may be used, though "kitten" is more common.

== Development ==
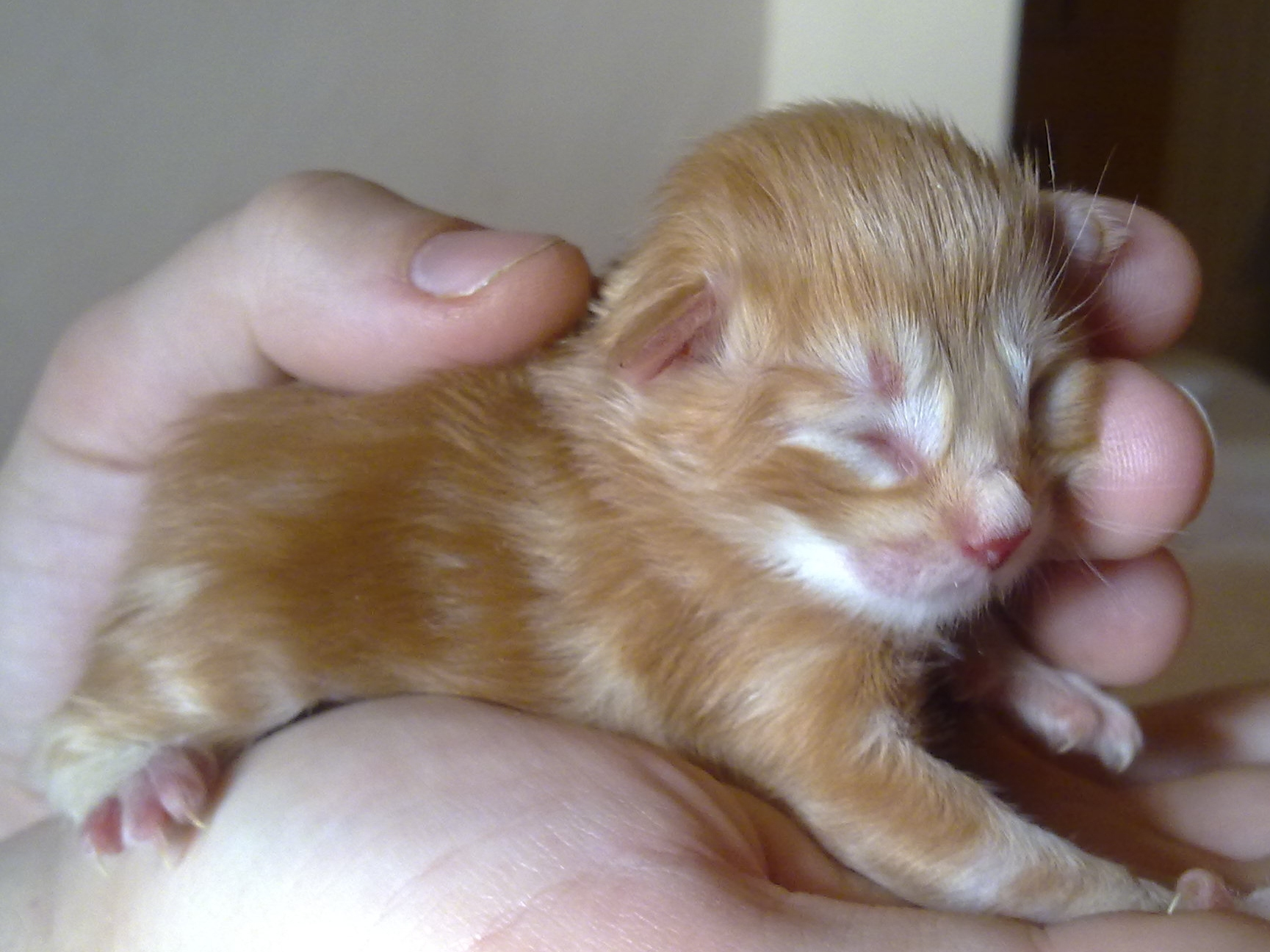
A newborn Norwegian Forest kitten.

A feline litter usually consists of two to five kittens, but litters with one to more than ten are known. Kittens are typically born after a gestation lasting between 64 and 67 days, with an average length of 66 days. When they are born, kittens emerge in a sac called the amnion, which is bitten off and eaten by the mother cat.

For the first several weeks, kittens cannot urinate or defecate without being stimulated by their mother. They also cannot regulate their body temperature for the first three weeks, so kittens born in temperatures less than 27 °C (81 °F) can die from hypothermia if their mother does not keep them warm. The mother's milk is very important for the kittens' nutrition and proper growth. This milk transfers antibodies to the kittens, which helps protect them against infectious diseases. As mentioned above, they cannot urinate, so they have a very high requirement for fluids. Kittens open their eyes about seven to ten days after birth. At first, the retina is poorly developed and vision is poor. Kittens cannot see as well as adult cats until about ten weeks after birth.

Kittens develop very quickly from about two weeks of age until their seventh week. Their coordination and strength improve, and they play-fight with their littermates and begin to explore the world outside the nest or den. They learn to wash themselves and others as well as play hunting and stalking games, showing their inborn ability as predators; the kittens' mother or other adult cats help develop these innate skills by bringing live prey to the nest. Later, the mother demonstrates hunting techniques for the kittens to emulate. As they reach three to four weeks old, the kittens are gradually weaned and begin to eat solid food, with weaning usually complete by six to eight weeks. Kittens generally begin to lose their baby teeth around three months of age, and they have a complete set of adult teeth by nine months. Kittens live primarily on solid food after weaning, but they usually continue to suckle from time to time until separated from their mothers. Some mother cats will scatter their kittens as early as three months of age, while others continue to look after them until they approach sexual maturity.

The sex of kittens is usually easy to determine at birth. By six to eight weeks, this becomes harder because of the growth of fur in the genital region. The male's urethral opening is round, whereas the female's urethral opening is a slit. Another marked difference is the distance between anus and urethral opening, which is greater in males than in females.

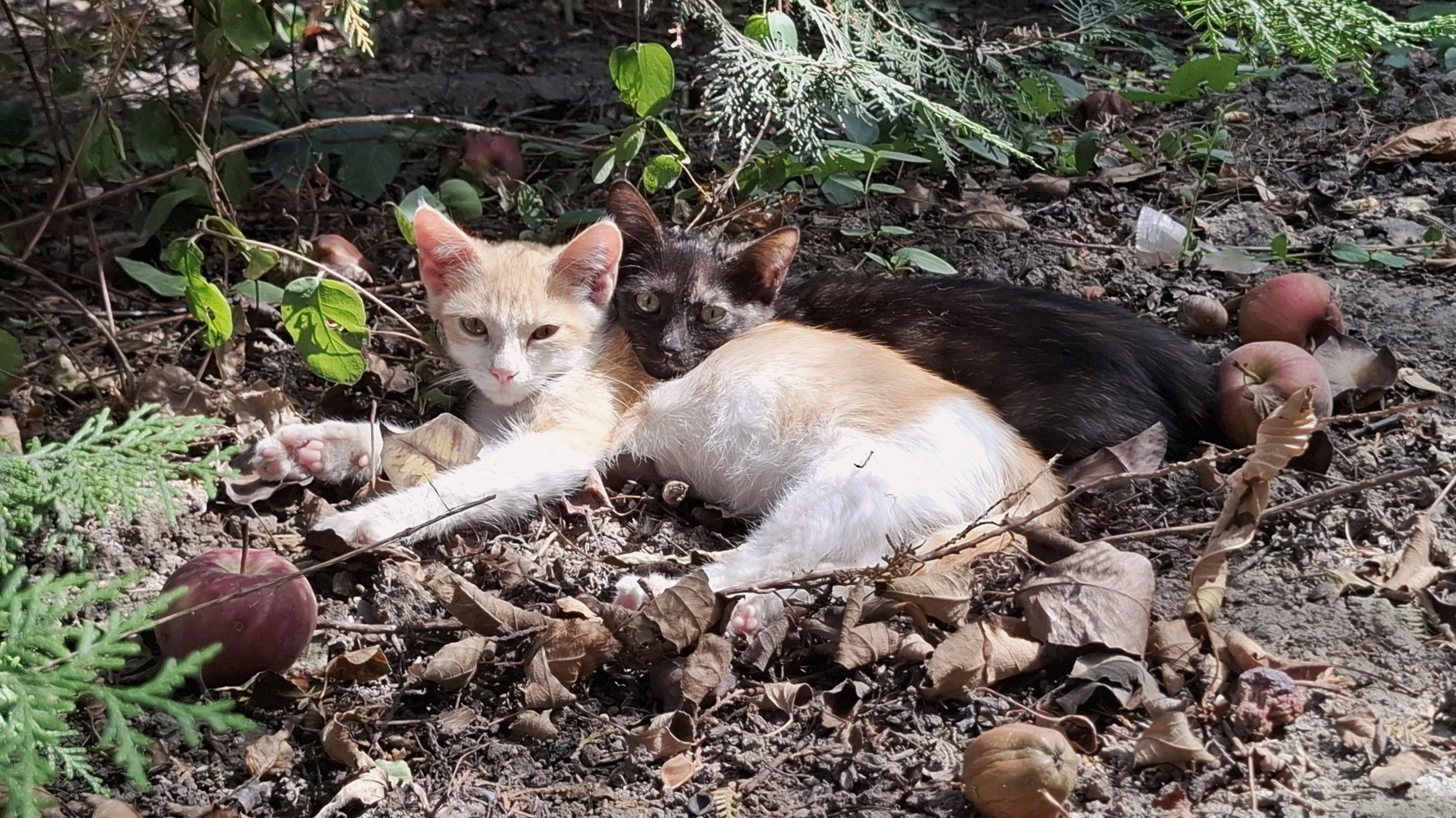
Two kittens resting close together for warmth and security

Kittens are very social and spend most of their waking hours interacting with other animals and playing on their own. Play with other kittens peaks in the third or fourth month after birth, with more solitary hunting and stalking play peaking later, at about five months.

Kittens are vulnerable because they like to find dark places to hide, sometimes with fatal results if they are not watched carefully. Cats have a habit of seeking refuge under or inside cars or on top of car tires during stormy or cold weather; this often leads to broken bones, burns, heat stroke, damaged internal organs or death.

Domestic kittens are commonly sent to new homes at six to eight weeks of age, but it has been suggested that being with their mother and littermates from six to twelve weeks is important for a kitten's social and behavioural development. Usually, breeders and foster/rescue homes will not sell or adopt out a kitten that is younger than twelve weeks. In many jurisdictions, it is illegal to give away kittens younger than eight weeks of age. Kittens generally reach sexual maturity at around seven months, and full "adulthood" around one year of age.

== Health ==
Domestic kittens in developed societies are usually vaccinated against common illnesses from two to three months of age. The usual combination vaccination protects against feline viral rhinotracheitis (FVR), feline calicivirus (C), and feline panleukopenia (P). This FVRCP inoculation is usually given at eight, twelve, and sixteen weeks, and an inoculation against rabies may be given at sixteen weeks. Kittens are usually spayed or neutered at seven months of age, but kittens may be neutered as young as seven weeks (if large enough), especially in animal shelters. Such early neutering does not appear to have any long-term health risks for cats, and it may even be beneficial in male cats. Kittens are commonly given deworming treatments for roundworms from about four weeks.

A kitten suckling its mother

== Nutrition ==
Felines are carnivores and have adapted to animal-based diets and low carbohydrate inclusion. Kittens belong to the growth life stage and have high energy and protein requirements. When feeding a kitten, it is often recommended to use highly digestible ingredients and a variety of components to support development and ensure a healthy adult cat. In North America, diets certified by the Association of American Feed Control Officials (AAFCO) are accepted as adequate nutrition; therefore, kitten diets should be AAFCO-approved to guarantee complete supplementation. Key components of the diet are high fat content to meet caloric requirements of growth, high protein to promote muscle growth, and supplementation of certain nutrients such as docosahexaenoic acid to support brain development and the optimization of cognition.

=== Pre-weaning nutrition ===
==== Establishing immunity ====
Part of the kitten's immune system is the mucosal immune system, which is within the gastrointestinal tract. The mucosal immune system is largely responsible for coordinating proper immune responses by tolerating innocuous antigens and attacking foreign pathogens. In order to optimize kitten health and increase chances of survival, it is important to optimize the link between the gut-associated lymphoid tissue and the microbiota of the gastrointestinal tract. Lasting health and longevity can be promoted partly through proper nutrition, as well as by establishing a healthy gut from birth through the use of colostrum.

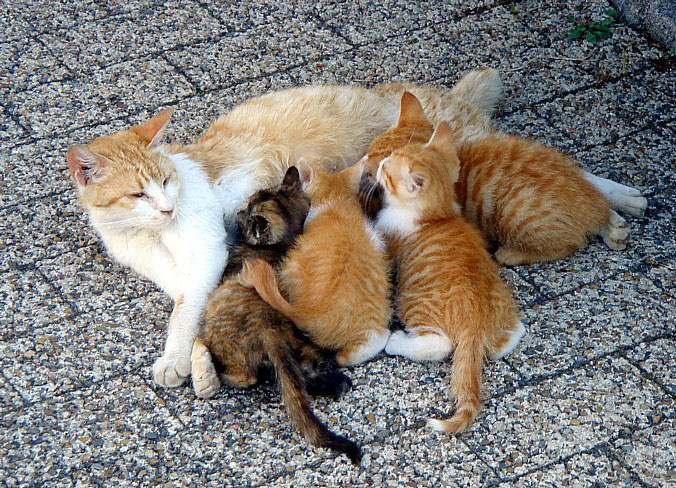
A litter of kittens suckling their mother

Within the first two days after birth, kittens acquire passive immunity from their mother's milk. Milk within the first few days of parturition is called colostrum and contains high concentrations of immunoglobulins. These include immunoglobulin A and immunoglobulin G, which cross the neonatal intestinal barrier. The immunoglobulins and growth factors found in the colostrum begin to establish and strengthen the weak immune system of the offspring. Kittens are able to chew solid food around 5–6 weeks after birth, and it is recommended that 30% of their diet consist of solid food at this time. The kitten remains on the mother's milk until around eight weeks of age, when weaning is complete and solid food becomes the primary food source.

=== Post-weaning nutrition ===
==== Fat ====
Until approximately one year of age, kittens are in a growth phase during which energy requirements can be up to 2.5 times higher than maintenance. Pet nutritionists often suggest offering a commercial cat food designed specifically for kittens starting at four weeks of age. Fat has a higher caloric value than carbohydrates and protein, supplying 9 kcal/g. The growing kitten requires arachidonic and linoleic acid, which can be provided in omega−3 fatty acids. Docosahexaenoic acid (DHA) is another vital nutrient that can be supplied through omega−3 fatty acids. Addition of DHA to the diet benefits the cognition, brain, and visual development of kittens.

==== Protein ====
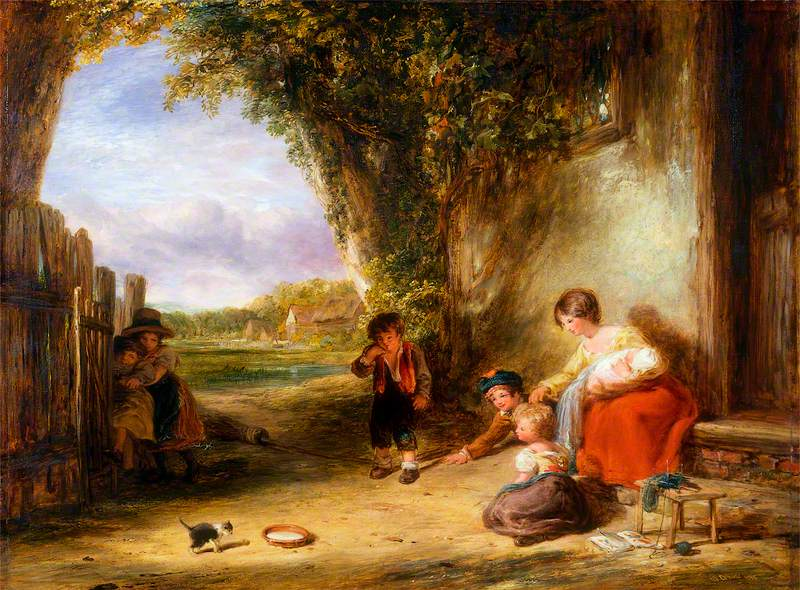
The Stray Kitten by William Collins, 1835

Cats are natural carnivores and require high amounts of protein in the diet. Since kittens are in a growth phase, they need substantial levels of protein to supply essential amino acids for the development of tissues and muscles. It is recommended that kittens consume a diet containing approximately 30% protein, on a dry matter basis, for proper growth.

Taurine is an essential amino acid found only in animal tissue; the mother cat cannot produce enough of it for her kittens. As it is an indispensable amino acid, it must be provided exogenously through the diet at 10 mg per kg of bodyweight, each day. Taurine deficiency can lead to poor growth in kittens, and it can cause retinal degeneration in cats.

==== Carbohydrates ====
Felines are natural carnivores and do not intentionally consume large quantities of carbohydrates. The domestic cat's liver has adapted to the lack of carbohydrates in the diet by using amino acids to produce glucose, which fuels the brain and other tissues. Studies have shown that carbohydrate digestion in young kittens is much less effective than that of a mature feline with a developed gastrointestinal tract. Highly digestible carbohydrates found in commercial kitten food provide additional energy and fiber to stimulate the immature gut tissue. Soluble fiber such as beet pulp is commonly used as a stool hardener and has been shown to strengthen intestinal muscles and thicken the gut mucosal layer, helping to prevent diarrhea.

=== Diet composition ===
==== Amino acids ====
The lack of readily available glucose from the limited carbohydrates in the diet has resulted in the liver adapting to produce glucose from the breakdown components of protein — amino acids. The enzymes that break down amino acids are constantly active in cats. Thus, cats need a constant source of protein in their diet. Because they are constantly growing, kittens require an increased amount of protein to supply readily available amino acids for daily maintenance and for building new body components. There are many required amino acids for kittens. A dietary level of approximately 0.3% histidine is necessary for kittens since histidine-free diets cause weight loss. Tryptophan is required at about 0.15% as this level maximizes performance in kittens. Kittens also need the following amino acids supplemented in their diet: arginine to avoid an excess of ammonia in the blood — otherwise known as hyperammonemia, isoleucine, leucine, valine, lysine, methionine as a sulfur-containing amino acid, asparagine for maximal growth in the early post-weaning kitten, threonine, and taurine to prevent central retinal degeneration.

==== Vitamins ====
===== Fat-soluble vitamins =====
Vitamin A is required in kitten diets because cats cannot convert carotenes to retinol in the intestinal mucosa due to a lack of the necessary enzyme; therefore, this vitamin must be supplied in the diet. Vitamin E is another required vitamin in kitten diets; deficiency leads to steatitis, causing the depot fat to become firm and yellow-orange in colour, which is painful and leads to death. Also, vitamin D is essential because cats cannot convert it from precursors in the skin.

===== Water-soluble vitamins =====
Cats can synthesize niacin, but its breakdown exceeds the rate at which it can be synthesized, so they have a higher requirement for it, which can be fulfilled through an animal-based diet. Pyridoxine (vitamin B_{6}) is required in increased amounts because it is essential for amino acid metabolism. Vitamin B_{12} is an AAFCO-recommended vitamin that is essential for the metabolism of carbohydrates and protein, supports the nervous system and mucous membranes, contributes to muscle and heart function, and promotes normal growth and development. Choline is also an AAFCO-recommended ingredient for kittens; it is important for neurotransmission in the brain and serves as a component of membrane phospholipids. Biotin (vitamin B_{7}) is another AAFCO-recommended vitamin that supports the thyroid and adrenal glands as well as the reproductive and nervous systems. Kittens also require riboflavin (vitamin B_{2}) for heart health, pantothenic acid (vitamin B_{5}), and folacin (vitamin B_{9}).

==== Metabolism aids ====
Since kitten diets are very high in calories, ingredients must be implemented to ensure adequate digestion and utilization of these calories. Choline chloride is an ingredient that maintains fat metabolism. Biotin and niacin are also active in the metabolism of fats, carbs, and protein. Riboflavin is also necessary for the digestion of fats and carbohydrates. These are the main metabolic aids incorporated into kitten diets to maximize nutrient utilization.

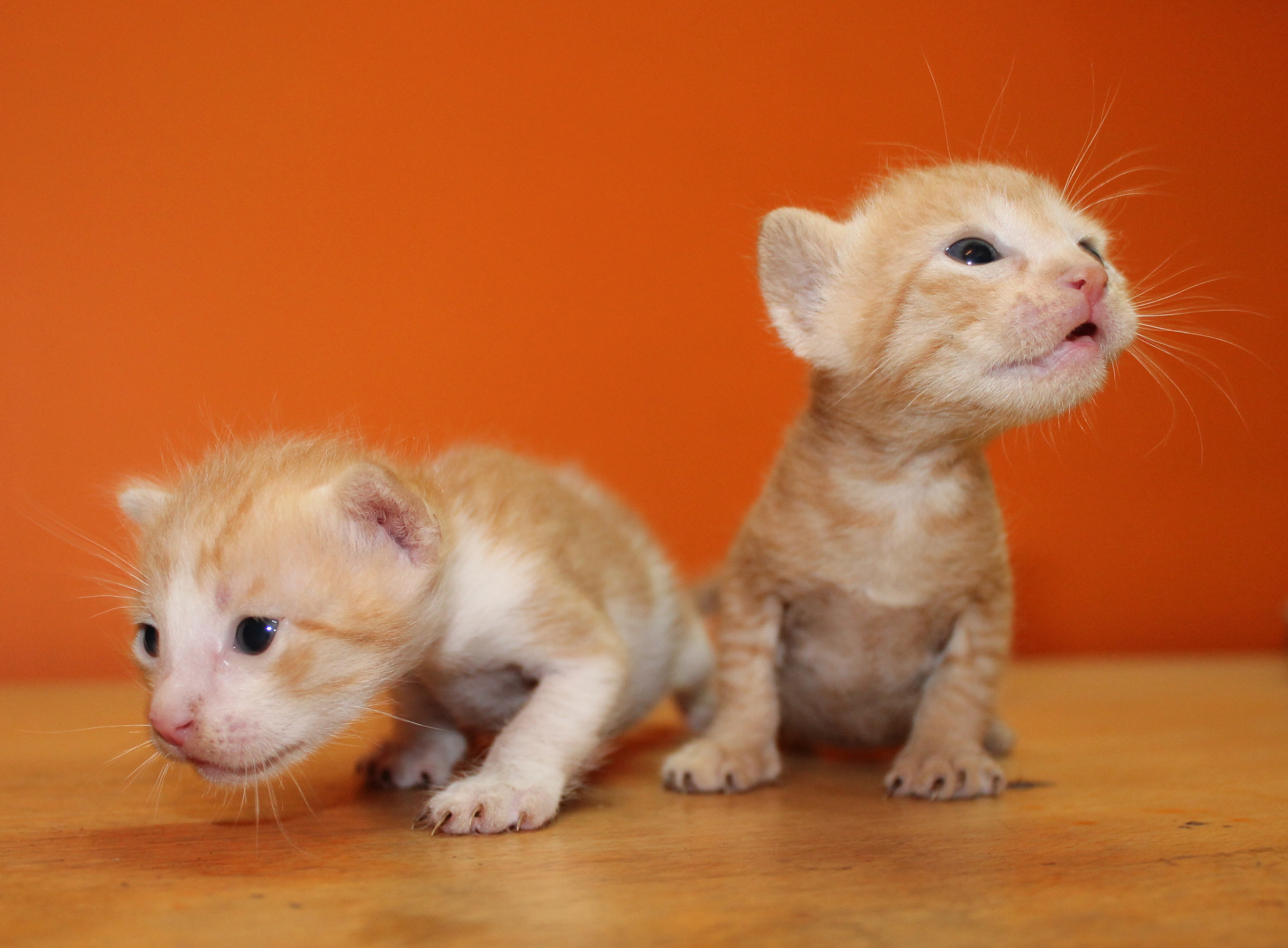
Twin kittens.

==== Growth and development ====
A combination of essential nutrients is used to satisfy the overall growth and development of the kitten's body. Nonetheless, many ingredients that kittens do not require are also included in diet formulations to promote healthy growth and development; these ingredients include: dried egg as a source of high-quality protein and fatty acids, flax seeds—which are rich in omega−3 fatty acids and aid in digestion, calcium carbonate as a source of calcium, and calcium pantothenate (vitamin B_{5})—which acts as a coenzyme in the conversion of amino acids and is important for healthy skin.

==== Immunity boosters ====
Antioxidants help support the development of a healthy immune system by preventing the oxidation of essential molecules in a growing kitten. Antioxidants in kitten diets can be derived from plant ingredients such as carrots, sweet potatoes, and spinach, as well as from dietary supplements like vitamin E and zinc proteinate.

== Orphaned kittens ==
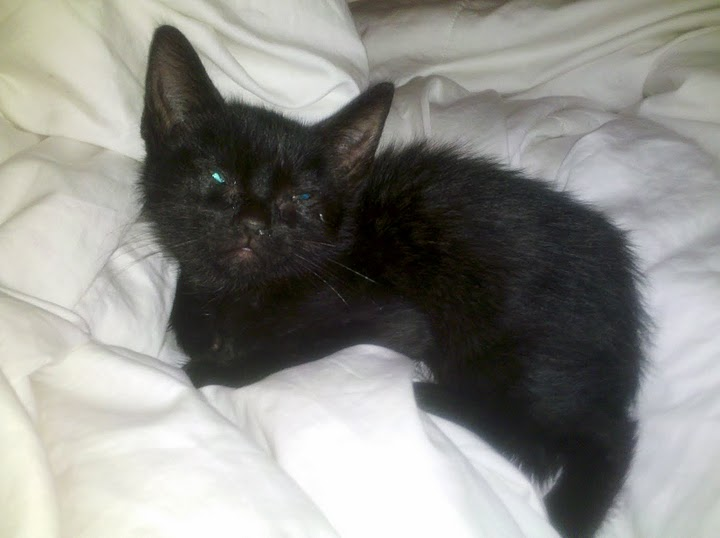
A young orphaned black kitten, showing signs of malnourishment

Kittens require a high-calorie diet that contains more protein than the diet of adult cats. Young orphaned kittens require cat milk every two to four hours, and they need physical stimulation to defecate and urinate. Cat milk replacer is manufactured to feed young kittens because cow's milk does not provide all the necessary nutrients. Human-reared kittens tend to be very affectionate with humans as adults and sometimes more dependent on them than kittens reared by their mothers, but they can also show volatile mood swings and aggression.

Depending on the age at which they were orphaned and how long they were without their mothers, these kittens may be severely underweight and can have health problems later in life, such as heart conditions. The compromised immune system of orphaned kittens—due to the absence of antibodies normally found in the mother's milk—can make them especially susceptible to infections, often necessitating antibiotics.

== See also ==
- Felis
- Puppy
- Queen-kitten separation

== Sources ==
=== Printed ===
- Bönisch, Susanne (1996). Natural Healing for Cats. Sterling Publishing Company. ISBN 978-0-8069-8122-2.
- Casal, Margret; Jezyk, Peter; Giger, Urs (1996). "Transfer of Colostral Antibodies From Queens to Their Kittens". American Journal of Veterinary Research. 57 (11): 1653–1658. doi:10.2460/ajvr.1996.57.11.1653. PMID 8915447.
- Crowell-Davis, Sharon (2005). "Cat Behaviour: Social Organization, Communication and Development". The Welfare of Cats. Animal Welfare. Vol. 3. Rochlitz. pp. 1–22. doi:10.1007/1-4020-3227-7_1. ISBN 1-4020-3226-9.
- Guilford, Grant (1994). "Nutritional Management of Gastrointestinal Tract Diseases of Dogs and Cats". Journal of Nutrition. 124 (12 Suppl): 2663S–2669S. doi:10.1093/jn/124.suppl_12.2663S. PMC 7107501. PMID 7996263.
- Heath, Sarah (2005). "Behaviour Problems and Welfare". The Welfare of Cats. Animal Welfare. Vol. 3. Rochlitz. pp. 91–118. doi:10.1007/1-4020-3227-7_4. ISBN 1-4020-3226-9.
- McHattie, Grace (1993). That's Cats! A Compendium of Feline Facts. David & Charles. ISBN 978-0-7153-0126-5.
- Messonnier, Shawn (2010). Natural Health Bible for Dogs & Cats: Your A-Z Guide to Over 200 Conditions, Herbs, Vitamins, and Supplements. Crown/Archetype Publishing. ISBN 978-0-307-55860-2.
- Olson, Patricia; Kustritz, Margaret; Johnston, Shirley (2001). "Early-age Neutering of Dogs and Cats in the United States". Journal of Reproduction and Fertility Supplement. 57: 223–232. PMID 11787153.
- Poirier, Frank; Hussey, Kaye (1982). "Nonhuman Primate Learning: The Importance of Learning from an Evolutionary Perspective". Anthropology & Education Quarterly. 13 (2): 133–148. doi:10.1525/aeq.1982.13.2.05x1830j. JSTOR 3216627.
- Spain, Victor; Scarlett, Janet; Houpt, Katherine (2004). "Long-term Risks and Benefits of Early-age Gonadectomy in Cats". Journal of the American Veterinary Medical Association. 224 (3): 372–379. doi:10.2460/javma.2004.224.372. PMID 14765796.
- Sturgess, Kit; Hurley, Karyl (2005). "Nutrition and Welfare". The Welfare of Cats. Animal Welfare. Vol. 3. Rochlitz. pp. 227–257. doi:10.1007/1-4020-3227-7_9. ISBN 1-4020-3226-9.
- Sunquist, Fiona; Sunquist, Mel (2014). The Wild Cat Book: Everything You Ever Wanted to Know About Cats. Chicago University. ISBN 978-0-226-14576-1.
- Tootle, John; Friedlander, Michael (1989). "Postnatal Development of the Spatial Contrast Sensitivity of X- and Y-cells in the Kittens Retinogeniculate Pathway". The Journal of Neuroscience. 9 (4). Journal of Neuroscience: 1325–1340. doi:10.1523/JNEUROSCI.09-04-01325.1989. PMC 6569875. PMID 2703879.
- Tsutsui, Toshihiko; Stabenfeldt, George (1993). "Biology of Ovarian Cycles, Pregnancy and Pseudo Pregnancy in the Domestic Cat". Journal of Reproduction and Fertility Supplement. 47: 29–35. PMID 8229938.
- Vandivert, Rita (1975). Understanding Animals as Pets. Illustrated Publishing. ISBN 978-0-7232-6118-6.
- Walls, Jerry (1991). Kittens as a New Pet. TFH Publications. ISBN 978-0-86622-614-1.
- Greco, D.S. (2014). Pediatric Nutrition. Veterinary Clinics of North America: Small Animal Practice. ISBN 978-0-32337-185-8.

=== Online ===
- "How to Raise Orphaned Kittens". Pet Education. Archived from the original on 15 July 2011.
- "Kittens Deaths ('Fading Kittens')". International Cat Care. Archived from the original on 13 April 2016.
- "Kitten". Oxford Dictionary. Archived from the original on July 18, 2012.
- "When Does a Kitten Become a Cat?". Santa Maria Times. 11 July 2010.
- "When Do Puppies and Kittens Lose Their Baby Teeth?". Veterinary Medicine. Archived from the original on 11 February 2017.
