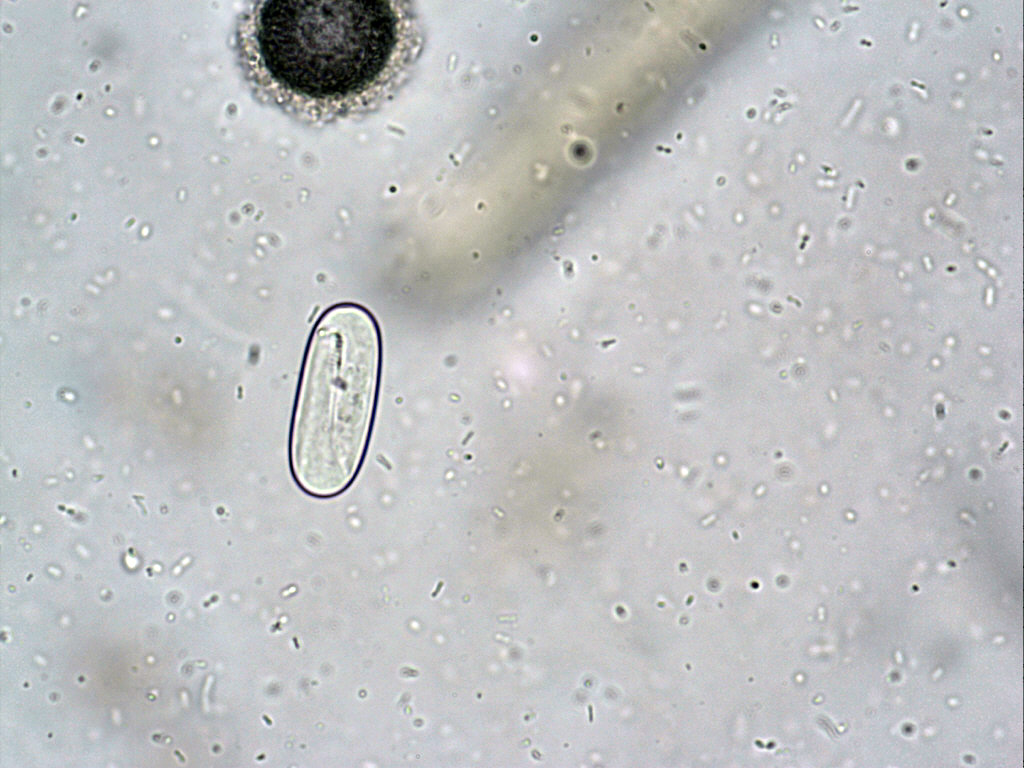
- Spirocerca lupi egg.

Scientific classification
- Kingdom: Animalia
- Phylum: Nematoda
- Class: Chromadorea
- Order: Rhabditida
- Family: Spirocercidae
- Genus: Spirocerca; Railliet & Henry, 1911

= Spirocerca =

Genus of roundworms

Spirocerca is a genus of nematodes belonging to the family Spirocercidae.

The genus has cosmopolitan distribution.

Species:

- Spirocerca arctica Petrov, 1927
- Spirocerca lupi (Rudolphi, 1809)
