= Romeo & Juliet (soundtrack) =

Romeo & Juliet (Original Motion Picture Soundtrack)

Film score by Abel Korzeniowski
- Released: 1 October 2013
- Recorded: June 2013
- Studio: Eastwood Scoring Stage, Warner Bros., Los Angeles
- Genre: Film score
- Length: 50:32
- Label: Sony Masterworks
- Producer: Abel Korzeniowski; Mina Korzeniowska

Abel Korzeniowski chronology
Escape from Tomorrow (2013)	Romeo & Juliet (Original Motion Picture Soundtrack) (2013)	Penny Dreadful (2014)

Romeo & Juliet (Original Motion Picture Soundtrack) is the score soundtrack to the 2013 film Romeo & Juliet, directed by Carlo Carlei; an adaptation of William Shakespeare's romantic tragedy and stars Douglas Booth and Hailee Steinfeld, as the eponymous principal characters. Abel Korzeniowski composed the film's orchestral score replacing James Horner, who was originally attached to score the film. The soundtrack was released through Sony Masterworks on 1 October 2013.

== Background ==
In October 2012, James Horner was roped in to compose the score for the film and recorded it at the Abbey Road Studios in London. At one point, Horner's score was supposed to be released through Sony Classical Records on 22 July 2013. But during post-production, Horner's score was scrapped and Abel Korzeniowski was hired to produce a new score for the film that was recorded at the Eastwood Scoring Stage in Warner Bros. Studios in Los Angeles during late-June 2013 with him conducting and orchestrating the Hollywood Studio Symphony. Sony Masterworks released the soundtrack featuring Korzeniowski's score on 1 October 2013.

== Reception ==
In a 5-star rating, Filmtracks.com wrote "This project is proof that pure crap on screen can still inspire greatness out of the right composer." Pete Simons of Synchrotones called it as "one of this year’s very best, incidentally alongside Escape from Tomorrow by Abel Korzeniowski". Justin Chang of Variety wrote "nary a single scene is allowed to play out untainted by Abel Korzeniowski’s score, which endlessly recycles the same banal theme with only minimal variations." Todd McCarthy of The Hollywood Reporter wrote "Abel Korzeniowski's constantly churning score employs heaving strings and trilling piano scales in an urgent attempt to rouse the emotions."

Tim Grierson of Screen International described it as an "earnest, sobbing score". Calling it as an "incessant score", Tim Robey of The Daily Telegraph called it as "a close cousin to Nino Rota's from the 1968 Zeffirelli film, if you imagine that one melodically misremembered and plonked over important scenes seemingly at random." Sara Stewart of New York Post called it as a "melodramatic soundtrack", while Bilge Ebiri of Vulture called it as a "lush, galloping score".

== Track listing ==
Romeo & Juliet (Original Motion Picture Soundtrack) track listing
No.	Title	Length
1.	"Juliet's Dream"	3:43
2.	"Forbidden Love"	2:58
3.	"Queen Mab"	2:27
4.	"The Cheek of Night"	2:25
5.	"First Kiss"	2:21
6.	"Trooping with Crows"	3:03
7.	"A Thousand Times Good Night"	6:51
8.	"Come, Gentle Night"	2:31
9.	"Wedding Vows"	2:50
10.	"Fortune's Fool"	4:00
11.	"From Ancient Grudge"	1:11
12.	"Death is My Heir"	1:33
13.	"Tempt Not a Desperate Man"	3:08
14.	"The Crypt" (Part 1)	5:08
15.	"The Crypt" (Part 2)	4:18
16.	"Eternal Love"	2:05
Total length:		50:32

== Personnel ==
Credits adapted from CD liner notes.

- Composer – Abel Korzeniowski
- Producer – Abel Korzeniowski, Mina Korzeniowska
- Recording and mixing – Joel Iwataki
- Assistant mixing – Phil McGowan
- Mastering – Stephen Marsh
- Score editor – Matt Shelton
- Musical assistance – Scott Starrett
- Pro-tools operator – Tom Hardisty, Vincent Cirelli
- Executive producer – Andy Spaulding, Bob Bowen, Jason Markey, Seth Kaplan

Orchestra

- Performer – The Hollywood Studio Symphony
- Orchestrator and conductor – Abel Korzeniowski
- Choir conductor and contractor – Jasper Randall
- Orchestra contractor – Peter Rotter
- Copyist – Edward Trybek, Neal Desby

Instruments

- Cello – Andrew Shulman
- Piano – Randy Kerber
- Soprano vocals – Tamara Bevard
- Viola – Andrew Duckles
- Violin – Roger Wilkie, Tereza Stanislav

== Accolades ==
Accolades for Romeo & Juliet (Original Motion Picture Soundtrack)
Award	Date of ceremony	Category	Result	Ref.
International Film Music Critics Association	February 23, 2014	Film Score of the Year	Won	
International Film Music Critics Association	February 23, 2014	Film Composer of the Year	Won	
International Film Music Critics Association	February 23, 2014	Best Original Score for a Drama Film	Won	
