= Robot Wants Kitty =

2010 video game

- Developer: Hamumu Software
- Publisher: Raptisoft
- Platforms: Web browser; iOS; Android
- Release: Browser; March 9, 2010 iPhone; March 17, 2011; Android; January 22, 2018 iPad; January 25, 2018
- Genres: Platform-adventure, Metroidvania
- Mode: Single-player

Robot Wants Kitty is a 2011 action-adventure platform game developed by American indie developer Hamumu Software. It was adapted from a 2010 Flash game of the same name.

== Plot ==
The player character is a robot who must navigate a maze to rescue a kitten.

== Gameplay ==
The player controls the robot as it navigates a series of six mazes, the goal in each being to reach the eponymous kitten. At the beginning of each level, the robot can do nothing but run left and right, but it will acquire additional abilities by obtaining items (called "apps") hidden throughout the maze, thus allowing it to backtrack and traverse previously impassable obstacles. Once the robot reaches the kitten, the robot is stripped of all of its apps and sent to the next level, where the process begins again.

There is also a timer. The player loses twenty seconds each time the robot is destroyed and respawns on the last checkpoint, gains one second for each enemy destroyed, and gains ten seconds for collecting a timesaver app.

== Reception ==
Reception

Aggregate score
Aggregator	Score
Metacritic	82/100

Review scores
Publication	Score
Eurogamer	8/10
Gamezebo	(Browser) 80/100
TouchArcade	4/5

The iPhone version received "favorable" reviews according to the review aggregation website Metacritic. TouchArcade said, "The way you acquire all of these abilities fits perfectly in to the Metroidvania formula ... it feel[s] like the essence of what makes said formula work so well has been practically perfectly distilled", but also added, "I suppose you could look at the fact that there's only six levels as a negative point of the game." Eurogamer called it "as charming as they come", and wrote that during the game, "comparisons to some of the genre's true greats spring to mind."
