= Injection-site sarcoma =

Type of malignant tumor found in animals

- Other names: feline injection-site sarcoma (FISS), vaccine-associated sarcoma (VAS)
- Symptoms: Mass
- Prevention: Avoidance of injections, avoidance of adjuvanted vaccines
- Treatment: Radical resection
- Frequency: 1–4 in 10,000 vaccinated cats

An injection-site sarcoma (ISS) or vaccine-associated sarcoma (VAS) is a type of malignant tumor found in cats (and occasionally dogs and ferrets) which has been linked to certain vaccines (and less commonly, other injections). VAS has become a concern for veterinarians and cat owners alike and has resulted in changes in recommended vaccine protocols.

These sarcomas have been most commonly associated with rabies and feline leukemia virus vaccines, but other vaccines and injected medications have also been implicated. The incidence of VAS is 1–4 in 10,000 vaccinated cats and has been found to be dose-dependent. (The rate varies among countries.) The time from vaccination to tumor formation varies from three months to eleven years. Fibrosarcoma is the most common VAS; other types include rhabdomyosarcoma, myxosarcoma, chondrosarcoma, malignant fibrous histiocytoma, and undifferentiated sarcoma.

VAS/FISS can also happen without injection due to other sources of local inflammation. Risks can be reduced by avoiding unnecessary injections and by keeping inflammation caused by injection to a minimum. It is also advised to inject in places that would make complete surgical removal easy should the tumor develop. Although the incidence rate of FISS makes the risk usually outweighed by the potential harm of not vaccinating a cat, it is recommended to evaluate the necessity of individual vaccines on a case-by-case basis.

== History ==
VAS was first recognized at the University of Pennsylvania School of Veterinary Medicine in 1991. An association between highly aggressive fibrosarcomas and typical vaccine location (between the shoulder blades) was made. Two possible factors for the increase of VAS at this time were the introduction in 1985 of vaccines for rabies and feline leukemia virus (FeLV) that contained aluminum adjuvant, and a law in 1987 requiring rabies vaccination in cats in Pennsylvania. In 1993, a causal relationship between VAS and administration of aluminium adjuvanted rabies and FeLV vaccines was established through epidemiologic methods, and in 1996 the Vaccine-Associated Feline Sarcoma Task Force was formed to address the problem and promote research.

In 2003, a study of ferret fibrosarcoma indicated that this species also may develop VAS. Several of the tumors were located in common injection sites and had similar histologic features to VAS in cats. Also in 2003, a study in Italy compared fibrosarcoma in dogs from injection sites and non-injection sites to VAS in cats, and found distinct similarities between the injection site tumors in dogs and VAS in cats. This suggests that VAS may occur in dogs.

== Pathology ==
VAS is preceded by local inflammation triggeering uncontrolled proliferation of fibroblasts and myofibroblasts. The more intense and long-lasting the inflmmation, the greater the risk. The classical source of inflmmation in VAS is the use of a vaccine containing aluminum adjuvant, as the adjuvant, by design, increases inflmmation to stengthen the immune response. Particles of aluminum adjuvant have been discovered in tumor macrophages. However, any kind of irritation can provide the trigger.

VAS/FISS has been reported in association with other types of injections, especially of irritating long-acting drugs (glucocorticoids, penicillin, lufenuron, cisplatin, and meloxicam). Very rarely there are cases that start with other reasons of inflmmation, such a suture, a piece of gauze, the site of a microchip implantation, and even a subcutaneous fluid port.

Similar examples of sarcomas developing secondary to inflammation include tumors associated with metallic implants and foreign body material in humans, and sarcomas of the esophagus associated with Spirocerca lupi infection in dogs and ocular sarcomas in cats following trauma. Cats may be the predominant species to develop VAS because they have an increased susceptibility to oxidative injury, as evidenced also by an increased risk of Heinz body anemia and acetaminophen toxicity.

Sibling observations suggest that VAS/FISS may have a genetic prediposition.

== Diagnosis ==
VAS appears as a rapidly growing firm mass in and under the skin. The mass is often quite large when first detected and can become ulcerated or infected. It often contains fluid-filled cavities, probably because of its rapid growth. Diagnosis of VAS is through a biopsy. The biopsy will show the presence of a sarcoma, but information like location and the presence of inflammation or necrosis will increase the suspicion of VAS. It is possible for cats to have a granuloma form after vaccination, so it is important to differentiate between the two before radical surgery is performed. One guideline for biopsy is if a growth is present three months after surgery, if a growth is greater than two centimeters, or if a growth is becoming larger one month after vaccination.

X-rays are taken prior to surgery because about one in five cases of VAS will develop metastasis, usually to the lungs but possibly to the lymph nodes or skin.

== Treatment ==
Treatment of VAS is through aggressive surgery. As soon as the tumor is recognized, it should be removed with very wide margins to ensure complete removal. Treatment may also include chemotherapy, radiation therapy, or immunotherapy with recombinant feline IL-2.

The most significant prognostic factor is initial surgical treatment. One study showed that cats with radical (extensive) initial surgery had a median time to recurrence of 325 days versus 79 days for cats with marginal initial excision. As a result, current guidelines for surgical treatment call for margins of at least 3 centimetres (1.2 in), ideally 5 centimetres (2.0 in). At least one fascial plane under the tumor should be removed. (The 2020 AAFP guidelines are more aggressive, only considering 5 cm and 2 planes "appropriate".)

The expression of a mutated form of p53, a tumor suppressor gene, is found commonly in VAS and indicates a poorer prognosis.

== Precautionary measures ==
Vaccination protocols have been revised to advice vaccination only as often necessary and as infrequently as possible. The feline leukemia virus (FeLV) should only be given to kittens and high risk cats; cats who already have FeLV antibodies or are already infected should not be given the vaccine. Feline rhinotracheitis/panleukopenia/calicivirus vaccines should be given as kittens, a year later and then every three years. Long-acting versions of drugs are also associated with sarcoma formation, so it would be wise to generally avoid unnecessary IM or SC injections: use oral, intranasal, or intravenous if possible.

Injections in cats should be given in areas that make complete surgical removal of VAS easier. Acceptable sites include the distal limbs and the tail, and as distally (close to the paw/away from the rest of the body) as possible. The Vaccination Guidelines Group (VGG) of the World Small Animal Veterinary Association suggests that if these sites are too hard to access, the loose skin over the lateral abdomen (primordial pouch) could be used. This part of skin is easier to cut out than others, though the AAFP level of removal would not be possible. Because any subcutaneous tumor would be easier to find and remove than one in the middle of muscle, SC should be used if an IM or SC has to be done.

Any cat that has received an injection should have the injection site checked regularly, per the "3-2-1" rule. If at 3 months after injection there is a mass larger than 2 centimetres (0.79 in) in diameter, or if there is a lump increasing in size 1 month after vaccination, the mass should be biopsied. In general, any mass in the skin of a cat should be checked.

There have been no specific associations between the development of VAS and vaccine brand or manufacturer, concurrent infections, history of trauma, or environment. No specific vaccine or adjuvant has been incriminated. However, the type of vaccine seems to have a meaningful association. Traditional inactivated vaccines need to use an immunologic adjuvant to induce enough immune response for effectiveness, but this local inflammation could also be a precursor to VAS if it does not subside quickly enough. The modified-live and recombinant vaccines cam produce enough of a response by themselves so most are made non-adjuvanted.

== See also ==
- Vaccine injury
