= ATCvet code QI06 =

Veterinary medical products classification subgroup

ATCvet code QI06 Immunologicals for Felidae is a therapeutic subgroup of the Anatomical Therapeutic Chemical Classification System for veterinary medicinal products, a system of alphanumeric codes developed by the World Health Organization (WHO) for the classification of drugs and other medical products for veterinary use. Subgroup QI06 is part of the anatomical group QI Immunologicals.

National versions of the ATC classification may include additional codes not present in this list, which follows the WHO version.

== QI06A Cat ==
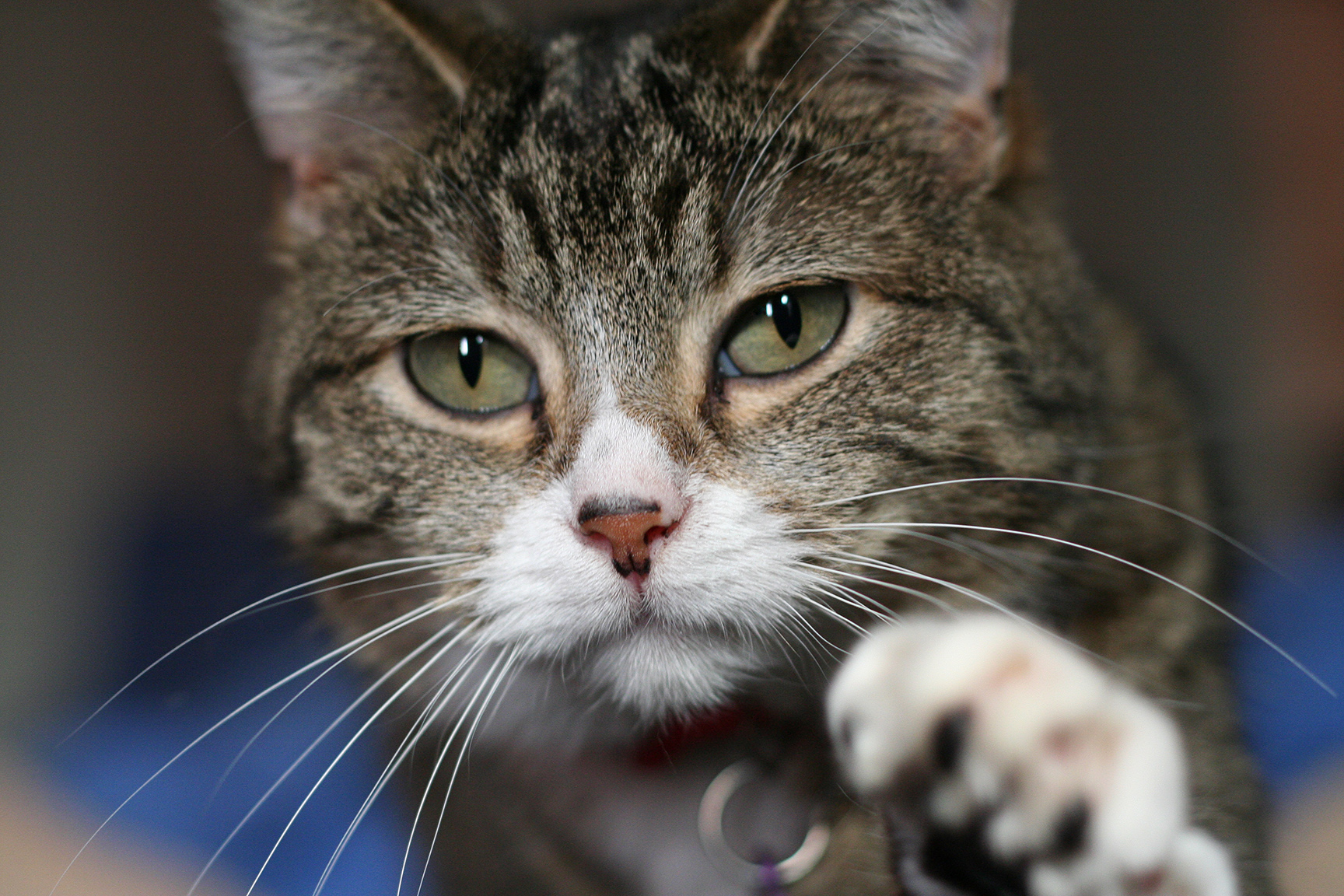

=== QI06AA Inactivated viral vaccines ===
QI06AA01 Feline leukaemia virus
QI06AA02 Feline panleukopenia virus/parvovirus
QI06AA03 Rabies virus + feline rhinotracheitis virus + feline calicivirus
QI06AA04 Feline rhinotracheitis virus + feline calicivirus + feline panleucopenia virus/parvovirus
QI06AA05 Feline rhinotracheitis virus + feline calicivirus
QI06AA06 Feline infectious peritonitis virus
QI06AA07 Feline calicivirus
QI06AA08 Feline rhinotracheitis virus
QI06AA09 Feline panleukopenia virus + feline calcivirus + feline rhinotracheitis virus + rabies virus
QI06AA10 Feline immunodeficiency virus

=== QI06AB Inactivated bacterial vaccines (including mycoplasma, toxoid and chlamydia) ===
Empty group

=== QI06AC Inactivated bacterial vaccines and antisera ===
QI06AC01 Chlamydia vaccine
QI06AC02 Bordetella vaccine

=== QI06AD Live viral vaccines ===
QI06AD01 Feline panleucopenia virus/parvovirus
QI06AD02 Feline infectious peritonitis virus
QI06AD03 Feline rhinotracheitis virus + feline calicivirus
QI06AD04 Feline panleucopenia virus/parvovirus + feline rhinotracheitis virus + feline calicivirus
QI06AD05 Feline panleucopenia virus/parvovirus + feline rhinotracheitis virus
QI06AD06 Feline parapox virus
QI06AD07 Feline leukaemia recombinant live canarypox virus
QI06AD08 Rabies, recombinant live canarypox virus

=== QI06AE Live bacterial vaccines ===
QI06AE01 Chlamydia
QI06AE02 Bordetella

=== QI06AF Live bacterial and viral vaccines ===
QI06AF01 Feline panleucopenia virus/parvovirus + feline rhinotracheitis virus + feline calicivirus + chlamydia

=== QI06AG Live and inactivated bacterial vaccines ===
Empty group

=== QI06AH Live and inactivated viral vaccines ===
QI06AH01 Live feline rhinotracheitis virus + live feline calicivirus + inactivated feline panleucopenia virus/parvovirus
QI06AH02 Live feline panleucopenia virus/parvovirus + inactivated rabies virus
QI06AH03 Live feline rhinotracheitis virus + inactivated feline panleucopenia virus/parvovirus
QI06AH04 Live feline panleucopenia virus/parvovirus + inactivated rabies virus + inactivated feline rhinotracheitis virus + inactivated feline calicivirus
QI06AH05 Live feline panleucopenia virus/parvovirus + live feline rhinotracheitis virus + live feline calicivirus + inactivated rabies virus
QI06AH06 Live feline panleucopenia virus/parvovirus + inactivated feline rhinotracheitis virus + inactivated feline calicivirus
QI06AH07 Live feline panleucopenia virus/parvovirus + live feline rhinotracheitis virus + live feline calicivirus + inactivated feline leukaemia virus
QI06AH08 Live feline rhinotracheitis virus + inactivated feline calicivirus antigen
QI06AH09 Live feline rhinotracheitis virus + live feline panleucopenia virus/parvovirus + inactivated feline calicivirus antigen
QI06AH10 Live feline rhinotracheitis virus + live feline panleucopenia virus/parvovirus + inactivated feline calicivirus + feline leukaemia recombinant live canarypox virus

=== QI06AI Live viral and inactivated bacterial vaccines ===
QI06AI01 Live feline panleucopenia virus/parvovirus + live feline rhinotracheitis virus + live feline calicivirus + inactivated chlamydia
QI06AI02 Live feline rhinotracheitis virus + live feline calicivirus + inactivated chlamydia
QI06AI03 Live feline panleucopenia virus/parvovirus + live feline rhinotracheitis virus + live feline calicivirus + live feline leukaemia virus + inactivated chlamydia

=== QI06AJ Live and inactivated viral and bacterial vaccines ===
QI06AJ01 Live feline rhinotracheitis virus + live feline calicivirus + inactivated feline panleucopenia virus/parvovirus + live chlamydia
QI06AJ02 Live feline rhinotracheitis virus + inactivated feline calicivirus antigen + live chlamydia
QI06AJ03 Live feline rhinotracheitis virus + inactivated feline calicivirus antigen + live feline panleucopenia virus/parvovirus + live chlamydia
QI06AJ04 Live feline rhinotracheitis virus + live feline calicivirus + live chlamydia + inactivated feline panleucopenia virus/inactivated feline leukaemia virus
QI06AJ05 Live feline rhinotracheitis virus + inactivated feline calicivirus antigen + live feline panleucopenia virus / parvovirus + live chlamydia + feline leukaemia recombinant live canarypox virus

=== QI06AK Inactivated viral and live bacterial vaccines ===
Empty group

=== QI06AL Inactivated viral and inactivated bacterial vaccines ===
QI06AL01 Feline panleucopenia virus/parvovirus + feline rhinotracheitis virus + feline calicivirus + feline infectious leukaemia virus + chlamydia
QI06AL02 Feline panleucopenia virus/parvovirus + feline rhinotracheitis virus + feline calicivirus + inactivated chlamydia
QI06AL03 Feline rhinotracheitis virus + feline calicivirus + chlamydia

=== QI06AM Antisera, immunoglobulin preparations, and antitoxins ===
QI06AM01 Feline panleucopenia virus/parvovirus antiserum + feline rhinotracheitis virus antiserum + feline calicivirus antiserum

=== QI06AN Live parasitic vaccines ===
Empty group

=== QI06AO Inactivated parasitic vaccines ===
Empty group

=== QI06AP Live fungal vaccines ===
QI06AP01 Trichophyton
QI06AP02 Trichophyton + microsporum

=== QI06AQ Inactivated fungal vaccines ===
QI06AQ01 Trichophyton + microsporum
QI06AQ02 Microsporum

=== QI06AR In vivo diagnostic preparations ===
Empty group

=== QI06AS Allergens ===
Empty group

=== QI06AT Colostrum preparations and substitutes ===
Empty group

=== QI06AU Other live vaccines ===
Empty group

=== QI06AV Other inactivated vaccines ===
Empty group

=== QI06AX Other immunologicals ===
Empty group

== QI06X Felidae, others ==
Empty group

== See also ==
- Feline vaccination
