= Queen-kitten separation =

Practice of separating kittens and mothers

Queen-kitten separation is the practice of separating kittens from their mothers in cat breeding. It is a near-universal practice amongst breeders globally. It is usually done within 8 to 12 weeks.

== Background ==
The female cat, or queen, is typically bred for the first time depends on when she reaches sexual maturity, which varies depending on breed. However, cat breeders can skip the first two or three heat cycles with the female. Veterinarians advise against skipping more than three heat cycles, as it puts the female at high risk of pyometra. The most ideal situation is to be able to purchase a "proven" male -- a male that a breeder has used for a few breedings and is now ready to part with. Veterinarians advise breeders to put cats nearing parturition to be separated and put into a birthing or "kittening" room by themselves. Artificial insemination is only permitted if both parents have a history of breeding naturally and if its use can be demonstrated to lead to an improvement in the welfare of potential offspring, and must be done by a qualified vet. Veterinarians advise breeders to have no more than one litter per year. Veterinarians also advise against breeding a cat more than four times in her lifetime. The recommended age to separate kittens from their mothers is no sooner than 8-12 weeks. Breeding facilities that prioritize profit over animal welfare, such as kitten factories, tend to ignore these guidelines.

== Early vs late separation ==
Early separation, or premature separation, is defined as separating kittens from their mothers before eight weeks of age. Premature separation can cause lifelong stress in kittens. Premature separation can also result in kittens failing to get the essential nutrients and antibodies provided by their mother's milk.
