= Ascarops =

Scientific classification
- Kingdom: Animalia
- Phylum: Nematoda
- Class: Chromadorea
- Order: Rhabditida
- Family: Spirocercidae
- Genus: Ascarops van Beneden, 1873

Genus of roundworms

Ascarops is a genus of nematodes belonging to the family Spirocercidae.

Species:

- Ascarops africana (Sandground, 1933)
- Ascarops dentata Linstow, 1904
- Ascarops kutassi (Schulz, 1927)
- Ascarops minuta van Beneden, 1873
- Ascarops mogera Yokohata & Abe, 1989
- Ascarops nema
- Ascarops scaptochiri Yin & Zhang, 1981
- Ascarops strongylina Rudolphi, 1819
- Ascarops talpa Huber, Schmidt & Kuntz, 1983
