= Limping calici =

Viral disease of cats

Limping calici is a viral disease of cats that shows itself in kittens aged around 8 to 12 weeks. Usually self limiting, It shows as a period of limping and inability to move about, but with the appropriate medical care tends to last about a week. The disease presents itself with fever, swelling and pain around the joints, and painful movement, the stress and pain from the disease can cause reduced food intake and may lead to secondary issues. There is no vaccine that could prevent this from happening, although the routine cat vaccinations include FCV i.e. Feline Calici Virus, the limping disease is caused by a different strain of virus than that of the Respiratory pathogens against which vaccinations are done routinely.

== See also ==
- Caliciviridae
- Feline calicivirus
