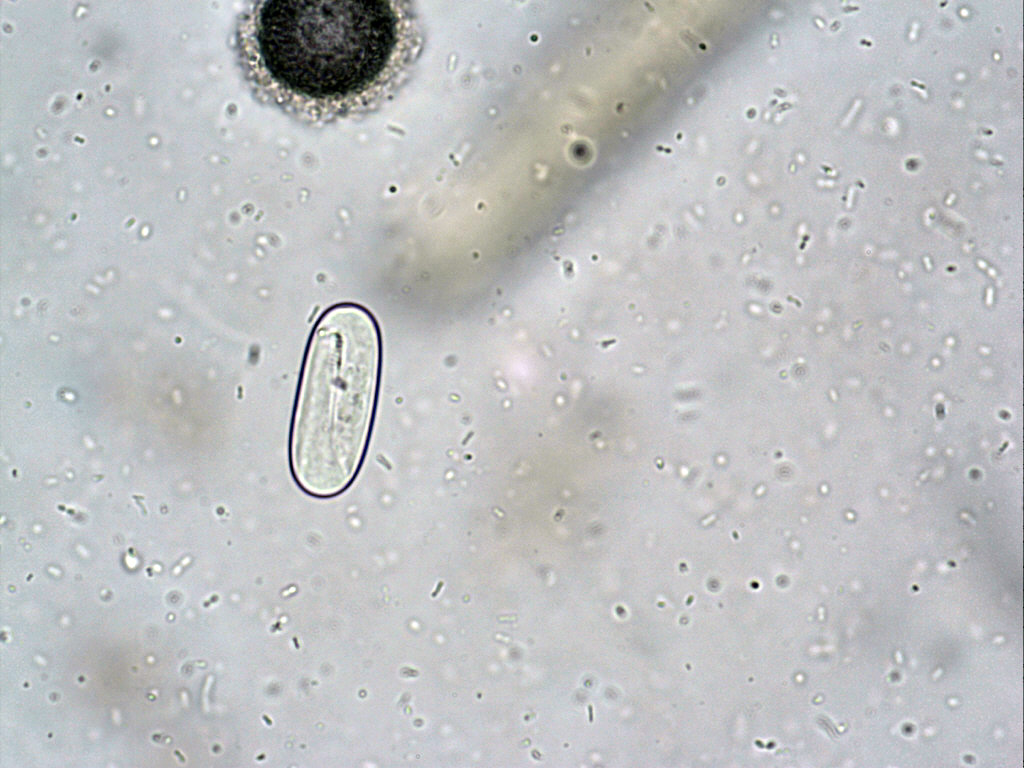
- Spirocerca lupi egg.

Scientific classification
- Kingdom: Animalia
- Phylum: Nematoda
- Class: Chromadorea
- Order: Rhabditida
- Family: Spirocercidae
- Genus: Spirocerca
- Species: S. lupi

Binomial name
- Spirocerca lupi (Rudolphi, 1809)

Synonyms
- Spiroptera sanguinolenta Rudolphi, 1819; Strongylus lupi Rudolphi, 1809

= Spirocerca lupi =

Species of roundworm

Spirocerca lupi is a species of nematode. In dogs, infestation can cause sarcoma of the esophagus. Doramectin has been used against it.
