= Escape from Tomorrow =

2013 film by Randy Moore

- Theatrical release poster
- Directed by: Randy Moore
- Written by: Randy Moore
- Produced by: Soojin Chung; Gioia Marchese
- Starring: Roy Abramsohn; Elena Schuber; Katelynn Rodriguez; Jack Dalton; Annet Mahendru; Danielle Safady; Alison Lees-Taylor
- Cinematography: Lucas Lee Graham
- Edited by: Soojin Chung
- Music by: Abel Korzeniowski
- Production companies: Mankurt Media; Producers Distribution Agency
- Distributed by: FilmBuff; Cinedigm
- Release dates: January 18, 2013 (Sundance); October 11, 2013 (United States)
- Running time: 90 minutes
- Country: United States
- Language: English
- Budget: $650,000
- Box office: $171,962

Escape from Tomorrow is a 2013 American horror film written and directed by Randy Moore in his directorial debut. It tells the story of an unemployed father having increasingly bizarre experiences and disturbing visions on the last day of a family vacation at the Walt Disney World Resort. It premiered in January at the 2013 Sundance Film Festival and was later a personal selection of Roger Ebert, shown at his 15th annual film festival in Champaign, Illinois. The independent film was a 2012 official selection of the PollyGrind Film Festival, but at the time filmmakers were still working on some legal issues and asked that it not be screened.

The film drew attention, because Moore had shot most of it on location at both Walt Disney World Resort and Disneyland Park without permission from the Walt Disney Company, owner and operator of both properties. Due to Disney's reputation of being protective of its intellectual property, the cast and crew used guerrilla filmmaking techniques to avoid attracting attention, such as keeping their scripts on their phones and shooting on handheld video cameras similar to those used by park visitors. After principal photography was complete, Moore was so determined to keep the film a secret from Disney that he edited it in South Korea. Sundance similarly declined to discuss the film in detail before it was shown. It has been called "the ultimate guerrilla film". Rather than suppressing the film as Moore anticipated would happen, Disney did not respond.

It has been compared to the work of Roman Polanski and David Lynch. Although many who saw it at the Sundance Film Festival expressed strong doubts that the film would be shown to a wider audience due to the legal issues involved and the negative depiction of the parks, the Walt Disney Company did not prevent the film from being released. At the time of its premiere, Disney stated that it was "aware" of the film; since then the online supplement to Disney A to Z: The Official Encyclopedia has included an entry for the film.

It was released simultaneously to theaters and video on-demand on October 11, 2013, through Producers Distribution Agency, a Cinetic Media company. It has received mixed to negative reviews, praising its visuals and ambitious production, but criticizing its execution.

== Plot ==
On the last day of his family's vacation at Walt Disney World, blue-collar worker Jim White gets fired for an unknown reason, during a phone call with his boss at the Contemporary Resort Hotel. Refusing to ruin the vacation, Jim keeps it to himself. The family leaves their hotel room and takes the monorail to the park alongside two French teenage girls, Isabelle and Sophie, who pique Jim's interest, unbeknownst to his wife Emily, and their two children Elliot and Sara.

During the rides, Jim has a series of bizarre and disturbing hallucinations, such as the faces of Audio-Animatronic characters warping and taking on evil appearances, and his family verbally abusing him.

After an argument with Emily, Jim takes their children to various Disney park rides, while pursuing Sophie and Isabelle. Later on, he meets a mysterious woman, who uses her necklace to hypnotize him, making him black out and wake up to her raping him. She informs him that the parks' wholesome, costumed princesses are actually part of a secret prostitution ring that services rich Asian businessmen and that the turkey legs sold in the park are actually emu meat.

Jim's attempts to meet Isabelle and Sophie are noticed by Emily, causing tension between her and Jim, even when they go further with the children to Epcot. After Emily and Elliot return to the hotel following an argument with Jim resulting in her slapping Sara, Sophie approaches and invites Jim to come with her and Isabelle. When Jim refuses, Sophie spits in his face and walks off. Jim notices that Sara has disappeared and frantically searches for her, until the park guards use a taser to knock him unconscious.

Jim awakens in a secret detention facility under Epcot's Spaceship Earth where he sees pictures of a naked woman he imagined on the Soarin' ride, and video screens displaying events that happened earlier. A scientist discusses Jim's flights of fantasy and imagination, revealing that he is part of an experiment by the Siemens Corporation ever since he first went to the theme park as a child with his father. His boss is in on the conspiracy and his firing was all part of the plan along with the closure of the Buzz Lightyear ride, just as he and Elliot approached the boarding area. The scientist also tells Jim that he had turned in Elliot to them, like Jim's father had done to him as a child.

After damaging the instrument panel with medical ointment and decapitating the scientist, who turns out to be an android, Jim escapes the laboratory through a sewer. He finds that Sara has been captured by the mysterious woman, now wearing a Snow White costume. She proceeds to tell them about her past as a costumed princess, which ended after she crushed and killed a girl. She hypnotizes Jim with the necklace again, but Sara removes and destroys it, freeing Jim from the spell, and allowing her and Jim to escape.

After returning to the hotel room with Sara, Jim has digestive distress, and vomits up a large amount of blood and hairballs, which he recognizes as symptoms of cat flu, brought on by Sophie spitting on his face earlier, unknowingly infecting him. Elliot, awoken by the noises in the bathroom, comes in to find Jim on the verge of death. He weakly begs Elliot for help, but he closes the door.

The next day, a distressed Emily finds Jim's dead body, which now has cat eyes and a grinning face. Cleaning staff arrive to remove the proof, with one of them filling Elliot's head with false memories of riding the Buzz Lightyear attraction. As Jim's body is taken away, a new family comes to the hotel, which consists of another version of Jim, the woman from the Soarin' attraction, and their daughter.

== Cast ==
- Roy Abramsohn as Jim White
- Elena Schuber as Emily White
- Katelynn Rodriguez as Sara White
- Jack Dalton as Elliott White
- Danielle Safady as Sophie
- Annet Mahendru as Isabelle
- Alison Lees-Taylor as the Other Woman
- Lee Armstrong as the Man on Scooter
- Amy Lucas as the Nurse
- Zan Naar as the Fantasy Woman/New Wife
- Stass Klassen as The Scientist
- Trevor McCune as Valet
- Roger Davies as Roger Harrison

== Background ==
Randy Moore, a native of Lake Bluff, Illinois, frequently visited his father in Orlando after his parents were divorced. The two often spent time together at Walt Disney World nearby. "It was a special, physical place, and it became an emotional space," he told Filmmaker. He added: "Obviously, I have a lot of father issues that I can't separate from that place." Later, their relationship deteriorated.

He decided to pursue a career in film. After attending two other film schools, he graduated from Full Sail University in another Central Florida town, Winter Park, as the class valedictorian. He moved to Southern California and became a story editor, primarily doing uncredited rewrites.

In Hollywood, he married and started a family. Much like his own father, he frequently took his own children to Disneyland. "It wasn't until our first family trip together that this very visceral emotional landscape of my past, that I had by now nearly all but forgotten, hit me again like [a] bullet." On the family's first trip to Walt Disney World, the emotions grew stronger. "[I]t was like he was there as a ghost. We were going on the same rides I used to go on with him, but now we're no longer talking anymore."

His wife, a native of the former Soviet Union who had no memories or expectations like his, saw things with fresh eyes. Moore said "She's a nurse and goes between floors at hospitals. At one point she turned to me at some princess fair or something and said, 'This is worse than working the psych [ward] at the hospital.'"

He read Neal Gabler's biography of Walt Disney and took the children to Disneyland more frequently. "I became obsessed with finding a connection," he recalled later. He wrote the screenplay for Escape from Tomorrow in a month along with two others. An inheritance from his grandparents provided the bulk of the film's budget, which he put at around $650,000, triple what he had originally planned.

== Production ==
To me this is the future. Cameras in your hand. Cameras in your glasses. Anyone can be shooting at any time. And I think it will explode.

— Randy Moore

"There was nowhere else to do it," Moore says of his decision to use Disney World as a setting and shoot at the parks. Disney, which has a reputation for aggressively protecting its intellectual property, has been tolerant of visitors uploading videos of their visits to YouTube and elsewhere since most of those user-created videos project a positive image of the parks. But Moore did not expect to get permission from Disney to shoot there given his negative, surrealistic portrayal of the park.

Moore used guerrilla filmmaking techniques, which sometimes call for using locations without getting permission. Escape from Tomorrow is not the first film made in whole, or part, this way at the Disney parks. In 2010, the British street artist Banksy shot a scene for Exit Through the Gift Shop in one of the parks with his collaborator Mr. Brainwash. They managed to smuggle the footage out after being detained and questioned by park security. The following year, a viral found footage short, Missing in the Mansion, filmed in the Haunted Mansion, was distributed online without interference from Disney. In addition, the 1984 shot on video crime film "Blonde Death" includes scenes shot at Disneyland without permission.

Extensive pre-production was necessary. The unique nature of the film shoot dictated steps not normally taken in filmmaking, such as charting the position of the sun weeks in advance since they could not use lighting equipment. Scenes were rehearsed and blocked in hotel rooms, rather than the actual locations. "We must have walked through the entire movie at least eight or nine times during multiple scouting trips before we ever rolled camera," Moore says.

Before principal photography, the cast and crew bought season passes to both Disneyland Park and Walt Disney World Resort. They spent ten days in Florida, then returned to California for two weeks at Disneyland, making the resort depicted in the film a combination of both properties. Actors and crew entered the parks in small groups to avoid attracting attention. "At one point, I even made the camera department shave off their facial hair and dress in tourist attire, which almost provoked a mutiny," says Moore. Despite the actors wearing the same clothes for days on end, Moore told the Los Angeles Times, park personnel never appeared to notice them, save for one day near the end of filming when Disneyland security thought they were paparazzi harassing a celebrity family.

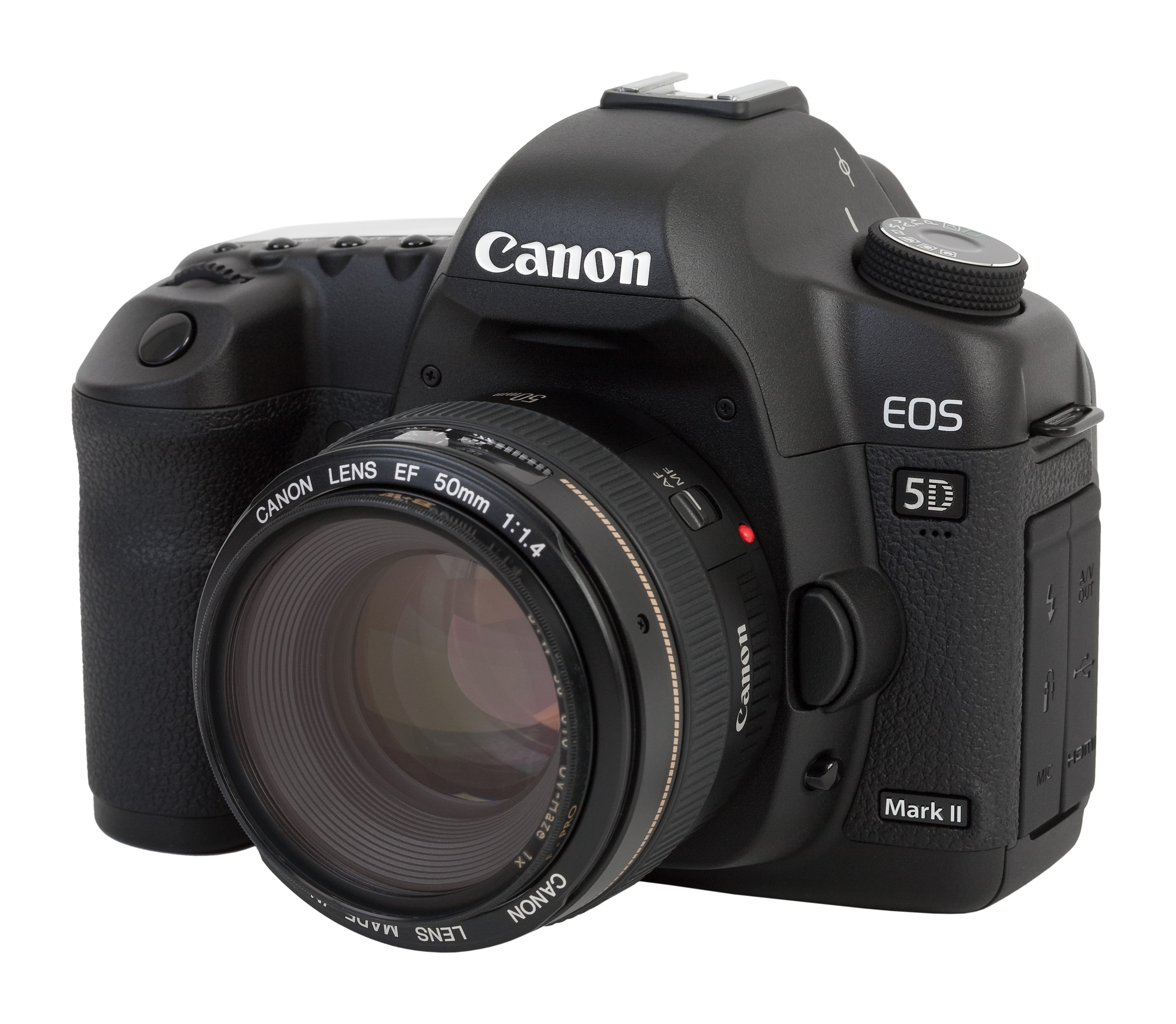
A Canon EOS 5D Mark II

The film was shot using the video mode of two Canon EOS 5D Mark II and one Canon EOS 1D Mark IV digital single-lens reflex camera, which helped the filmmakers look more like typical park visitors. To compensate for their inability to control the lighting, the film was shot in monochrome mode. "[W]e were shooting with really fast lenses wide open, so our depth of field was razor thin. Black and white helped us enormously with focus and composition, since we were doing almost everything in camera and didn't use a focus puller," Moore recalled. It was an irreversible choice. "[B]ecause the 5D doesn't shoot RAW, we customized settings in its monochromatic mode and couldn't go back to color, even if we had wanted to." Moore was comfortable with the result because of the surrealistic, dreamlike quality it created, forcing viewers to see the familiar sights of the Disney parks in a new way.

Actors and crew used their phones to communicate and store information such as the script—that way, they looked like guests casually using their phones. The phones were also used to record sound, in addition to digital recorders taped to each actor's body that were left running all day. For day scenes, Moore felt comfortable shooting three or four takes of each scene, but found he could do more at night.

In a screenshot from the film, Sara (left) and Jim (right) ride It's a Small World

Scenes involved riding on eight recognizable attractions in the parks. One required waiting in a long line for the Buzz Lightyear ride at Disneyland, and the actors rode It's a Small World at least 12 times to get the scene right. "I was surprised the ride operators weren't a little more savvy," Moore told The New York Times.

After the location filming, production went back to soundstages for interiors. Some scenes were shot against a green screen background for second unit footage of other locations to be substituted, allowing the use of crane shots. With the photography done, Moore took the film to South Korea to edit to prevent Disney from finding out. He did not tell most of his close friends what he was doing. Visual effects were done by the same company there that had done them for the 2006 South Korean monster film, The Host.

For the film's post-production process, sound editors had to listen to the entire uncut tracks from the recorders taped to the actors' bodies in order to find the dialogue. Content proprietary to Disney, such as the lyrics to "It's a Small World" and footage from Soarin', was removed from the film to avoid copyright infringement. Composer Abel Korzeniowski contributed a light, airy score similar to those used in Hollywood's Golden Age.

== Sundance ==
Moore submitted the film to the Sundance Film Festival, where many independent films seek distributors. He had little hope that it would be accepted due to the festival's corporate sponsors. But Trevor Groth, the festival's new director of programming, was "blown away" by Escape from Tomorrow, and accepted it for the festival's non-competitive "Next" category, for films that transcend the limitations of the low budgets common to most independent films.

When the 2013 festival began in Park City, Utah, the secrecy about the film continued. The festival's website only identified the setting as a theme park. Nan Chalat-Noaker, critic for the Park Record, recalls that the festival and even the film's publicist were unwilling to share further details about the film, but strongly urged critics to see it. In her review, she declined to identify the setting of the film by name, although she dropped broad hints, out of fear it would alert Disney's lawyers. The premiere, on the festival's first night, was not fully attended; when word got out to the attendees, all the other shows were effectively sold out.

== Reception ==
On review aggregation website Rotten Tomatoes, the film has an approval rating of 58% based on 88 reviews, with an average rating of 6/10. The site's critical consensus reads: "Conceptually audacious but only intermittently successful in execution, Escape From Tomorrow is nonetheless visually inventive and darkly surreal." On Metacritic, the film has a score of 58 out of 100, based on 27 critics, indicating "mixed or average" reviews.

Before the Martin Luther King Jr. Day weekend was over, Escape from Tomorrow was being widely discussed by festival attendees. The New York Times and the Los Angeles Times both ran articles about the film and Moore. Much of the attention focused on the audacity of the filmmaking. Movies.com reported that people were already calling it "the ultimate guerrilla film". On the night of the premiere, Drew McWeeny wrote:

It is not possible that this film exists. It is not possible that they shot long scripted sequences on the actual rides. It is not possible that I just saw a film in which it is suggested and then shown that the various Disney princesses all work as high-priced hookers who sell their wares to wealthy Asian businessmen. It simply cannot be true.

I grew up in Florida, and I have been going to Walt Disney World my entire life. I worked at that park. I've been there as a child, as a teenager, as an employee, and as a parent. I've done Disney sitting on my father's shoulders, and I've done the Disney parks with my kids sitting on my shoulders. It is a huge part of my DNA, and I can tell you that there is no way Randy Moore pulled off what I saw tonight. It is a film that should not exist by any rational definition.

And yet... not only does it exist, but it's fascinating.

He allowed that it was "undisciplined at times, rough around the edges in places, technically uneven, and there's no sense of pacing to it at all. Even so," he concluded, "there is a sort of naive charm that makes it impossible to look away."

Other critics concurred that the film had artistic merit. "[W]atching Moore's noir tale is like being super-glued to your seat while getting poked in the eye," Chalat-Noaker wrote. "It's both fascinating and repelling." Stephen Zeitchik of the Los Angeles Times called it "one of the strangest and most provocative movies this reporter has seen in eight years attending the Sundance Film Festival". At Indiewire, Eric Kohn wrote that "Moore portrays Disney World as the ultimate horror show – and gets the point across in nearly every scene".

While they conceded the film's audacious production made it worth their time to watch, other critics found flaws. "It's not a great film. The story has some good ideas, but the execution is uneven," wrote Peter Sciretta at /Film, while still recommending it as "unlike anything you've seen before [or will] see again". Similarly, CraveOnline's William Bibbiani "wouldn't have missed it for the world" but qualified it by noting that the film often lacked "cohesion and clarity".

A.O. Scott of The New York Times and Michael O'Sullivan of The Washington Post each also gave a negative review for this film. "None of it is as scary or as funny as it should be," the former wrote, "and what starts out as a sly thumb in the eye of corporate power ends up as a muddled and amateurish homage to David Lynch".

== Release ==
The film premiered on October 11, 2013, opening in thirty theaters in the United States, and reporting total box office grosses of $171,962.

== Possibility of legal issues ==
Many journalists who saw the film at Sundance speculated that it was likely that Disney would take legal action to prevent the film from being shown around the festival. McWeeny said about the film: "Disney's lawyers are probably climbing onto helicopters and planning a raid on Park City right now." Critics urged others present to see it before it was too late, and commented that it was questionable if those not present at the festival would ever have an opportunity to see it.

However, others noted that if Disney had attempted to block the film's release, it was unclear on what legal grounds it could be done. Moore took care to avoid direct copyright infringement of songs or films played as part of attractions, and intellectual property law is less clear on the other aspects of the film. Science fiction writer Cory Doctorow, who distributed his first novel, Down and Out in the Magic Kingdom, set in a 22nd-century Disney World, under a Creative Commons license, believes there is at most "a possible trademark claim, and I suppose that Disney could conceivabl[y] bring suit for violating the park's terms of use, but these are much harder cases to make than copyright."

Columbia Law School professor Tim Wu did not think Disney would have any defensible intellectual property claim. "Though the filmmakers may have committed trespass when they broke Disney World's rules and if it violated the terms of entry on their tickets, the film itself is a different matter," he wrote on The New Yorker's blog. "As commentary on the social ideals of Disney World, it seems to clearly fall within a well-recognized category of fair use, and therefore probably will not be stopped by a court using copyright or trademark laws."

Despite the film's repeated use of Disney's characters and iconography, Wu explained, trademark law was insufficient. "Disney does not have some kind of general intellectual-property right in Disney World itself." To make a trademark-infringement case against Moore, he continued, Disney would have to convince a court that the use of its protected imagery in the movie could reasonably lead viewers to believe that it had a role in the film's production, and he did not think that was a plausible argument. "The scene where a Disney Princess attempts to crush a child seems to eliminate that possibility."

As for copyright, Wu saw Moore's use of the Disney parks as transformative:

... [H]is use of Disney World is not as simple window dressing; he transforms it into something gruesome and disturbing—a place where, for example, guests are sometimes tasered and have their imaginations purged ... It might be a violation if Moore had made a film designed for viewers who wanted to see Disney World but were too lazy to go to Florida. Escape from Tomorrow, however, is clearly no substitute for buying a ticket.

As such, he saw the film as offering artistic commentary on the cultural impact of Disney, and thus clearly falling under fair use. Wu likened it to a 1990s case brought by Mattel against artist Thomas Forsythe, after he sold some of his photographs depicting another American icon, Barbie, being eaten by vintage appliances as a way of calling attention to the toy doll's role in promoting the objectification of women in American culture. Not only did the court dismiss Mattel's complaint, "[t]he judges were so annoyed by the lawsuits that they awarded attorney's fees of nearly two million dollars to the artist ... A judge has to think of the First Amendment when asked to ban art work."

In his film review, Sciretta raised another issue:

Intellectual property and copyrights aside, many people appear in this film who have never signed a release. Real families and children are seen in the background of almost every shot. None of them gave permission or knew they were being filmed for a feature film.

At Slate, Aisha Harris allowed that this was a possibility, especially if children were filmed without their parents' consent, but noted "the law on that issue is not black and white either."

=== Response by Disney ===
Disney did not return reporters' calls or emails for comment, nor did it take any legal action during the festival, although it confirmed to CNN that it was "aware" of the film. Despite critical apprehension that the film would never be shown outside the festival, some observers saw the situation as more complex. Were Disney to attempt to forcefully suppress the film, that effort could serve to draw even more attention to it, a phenomenon known as the Streisand effect.

Michael Ryan, director of The YoungCuts Film Festival, noted that there was a precedent for the film in the Air Pirates lawsuit, in which Disney spent eight years in court with some underground cartoonists who had published an underground comix parody in which Mickey Mouse and the other Disney characters engaged in explicit sex and used illegal drugs, among other behavior they avoided in Disney's own narratives. He suggested that Disney buy the rights and release the film itself, which it could easily do as its announced interest would guarantee it a monopsony on the film since no other distributor would want to match Disney's deep pockets or its feared legal response. As a Disney release, Escape from Tomorrow would have a large potential audience of both Disney enthusiasts and antagonists, Disney would be making money from property it already owns instead of someone else and the company's apparent willingness to go in the joke would take some of the satiric edge off.

Moore expressed hope that the film could be shown and released, even if it meant a legal battle.

It depends on how good a case lawyers can make for it. If they say I have a chance, I'll definitely fight for it. I worked on it really hard for three years and it took a lot out of me. Just to let it disappear would be a waste of time.

Since the film's release Disney has acknowledged it in another way. The online supplement to Disney A to Z: The Official Encyclopedia includes an entry for Escape from Tomorrow, describing it as "An independent surrealistic cult film surreptitiously filmed at Walt Disney World and Disneyland."

According to The Hollywood Reporter, Disney chose to avoid responding to the film altogether, rather than seeking legal action, in an effort to prevent increased publicity.

== Awards ==
Award	Category	Nominee	Result	Ref(s)
IFMCA Award	Composer of the Year	Abel Korzeniowski for Romeo & Juliet and Escape from Tomorrow	Won	
IFMCA Award	Best Original Score for a Fantasy/Science Fiction/Horror Film	Abel Korzeniowski	Nominated	
IFMCA Award	Film Music Composition of the Year	"The Grand Finale", music by Abel Korzeniowski	Nominated	

== Sequel ==
A sequel titled Return from Tomorrow was unveiled at the 2026 Florida Film Festival on April 11. Randy Moore returned to direct the film, while Roy Abramsohn, Elena Schuber, and Annet Mahendru reprised their roles playing different characters. Udo Kier played the father of Abramsohn's character, Tim Brown.

== See also ==
- The Florida Project, another film which covertly shot scenes on location at the Magic Kingdom.
- IKEA Heights, a comedic melodrama covertly shot at an IKEA
