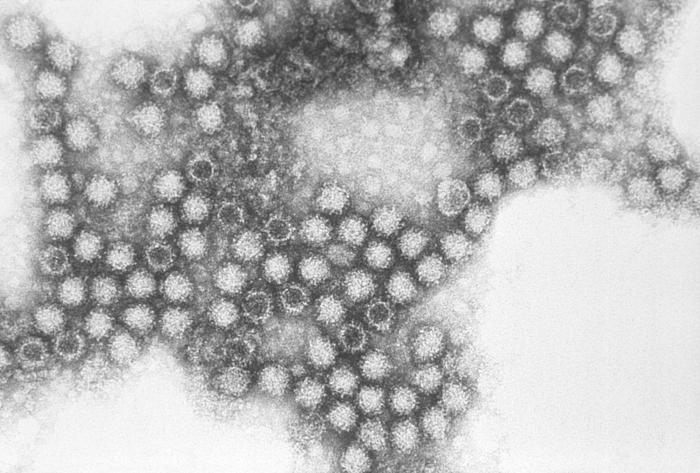
- Electron micrograph of Feline calicivirus virions

Virus classification
- (unranked): Virus
- Realm: Riboviria
- Kingdom: Orthornavirae
- Phylum: Pisuviricota
- Class: Pisoniviricetes
- Order: Picornavirales
- Family: Caliciviridae
- Genus: Vesivirus
- Species: Vesivirus felis

Synonyms
- Feline picornavirus

= Feline calicivirus =

Species of virus

Feline calicivirus (FCV) is a virus of the family Caliciviridae that causes disease in cats. It is one of the two important viral causes of respiratory infection in cats, the other being feline herpesvirus. FCV can be isolated from about 50% of cats with upper respiratory infections. Cheetahs are the other species of the family Felidae known to become infected naturally.

== Viral structure and pathogenesis ==
Different strains of FCV can vary in virulence (the degree of pathogenicity within a group or species of microorganisms or viruses as indicated by case fatality rates and/or the ability of the organism to invade the tissues of the host). Being an RNA virus, FCV has a high elasticity of its genome, which makes it more adaptable to environmental pressures. This not only makes the development of vaccines more difficult, but also allows for the development of more virulent strains. In persistently infected cats, the gene for the major structural protein of the viral capsid (the outer protein coat of a mature virus) has been shown to evolve through immune-mediated positive selection, which allows the virus to escape detection by the immune system.

A form of FCV has been found to cause a particularly severe systemic disease in cats, similar to rabbit hemorrhagic disease (which is also caused by a calicivirus). This virus has been called virulent systemic feline calicivirus (VS-FCV) or FCV-associated virulent systemic disease (VSD). The disease is caused by direct viral invasion of epithelium and endothelium and secondary host immune response. Strains of VS-FCV have seemingly risen independently of one another since first being described, meaning that not all cases of VS-FCV have spread from a single case. Most of the outbreaks of VS-FCV have been reported in the United States. It was originally described in 1998 in Northern California.

The prevalence of FCV varies depending on the environment. In private households, FCV is present in about 10% of cats (either in active or carrier state), while the prevalence in shelters or catteries is 25 to 40%.

FCV replicates in the oral and respiratory tissues, and is secreted in saliva, feces, urine, and respiratory secretions. It can be transmitted through the air, orally, and on fomites. Infected cats usually shed the virus for two weeks. Following this period, infected cats never shed the virus again or become latently infected and shed the virus continuously or intermittently. Co-infection with either feline herpesvirus or feline immunodeficiency virus causes a more severe disease.

== Clinical signs ==
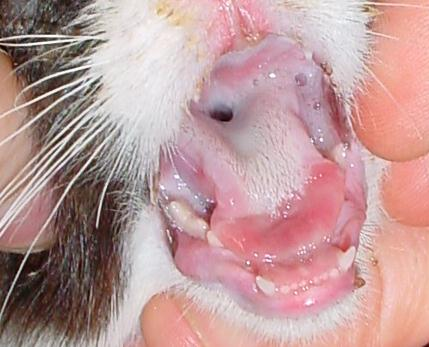
Feline calicivirus infection in a cat, showing ulceration over the rostral end of tongue and secondary gingivitis, faucitis and ptyalism. Note that rhinitis is also present.

Clinical signs in cats infected with FCV may develop acutely, chronically, or not at all. Latent or subclinical infections often become clinical when the cat is stressed, such as at the time of adoption. Acute signs of FCV include fever, conjunctivitis, nasal discharge, sneezing, and ulceration of the mouth (stomatitis). Pneumonia may develop with secondary bacterial infections. In addition to stomatitis, some cats may develop a polyarthritis, both probably immune-mediated through immune complex deposition. Stomatitis and polyarthritis can develop without any upper respiratory infection signs, but fever and loss of appetite may occur. Less commonly, glomerulonephritis can develop in chronic cases secondary to immune complex deposition. The great variability of clinical signs in individual cases of FCV is related to the relative virulence of different strains of the virus.

VS-FCV can cause a rapid epidemic, with a mortality rate of up to 67%. Initial clinical signs include discharge from the eyes and nose, ulceration in the mouth, anorexia, and lethargy, and occur in the first one to five days. Later signs include fever, edema of the limbs and face, jaundice, and multiple organ dysfunction syndrome.

Diagnosis of FCV is difficult without specific tests, because the signs are similar to other feline respiratory diseases, especially feline viral rhinotracheitis. The presence of stomatitis may indicate FCV. Specific tests include virus culture, polymerase chain reaction, and immunohistochemical staining.

== Treatment and prevention ==
There is no specific treatment for FCV. Antibiotics are used for secondary bacterial infections, and immune modulators, such as lymphocyte T-cell immune modulator, have been used for immune support. Nursing care and rehydration are used for dehydrated and anorexic cats. Corticosteroids or azathioprine may be used for polyarthritis. Stomatitis, which is in part caused by FCV, is difficult to treat, but new antiviral medications have emerged. These antivirals include molnupiravir (EIDD-2802) and EIDD-1931. Antibiotics, corticosteroids, and tooth extractions have also all been used with varying success. Cats on corticosteroids must be monitored carefully for worsening of any upper respiratory infection.

Natural immunity from maternal antibodies lasts in the kitten from three to nine weeks. After that, kittens are susceptible to FCV. Previous infection does not guarantee lifelong immunity, since an antigenically dissimilar FCV (such as VS-FCV) can cause infection. However, usually after the age of three years, FCV infections are mild or asymptomatic.

FCV vaccination will not always prevent disease, but can reduce the severity. FCV vaccines come in two types, inactivated (ATCvet code: QI06AA07 (WHO)) and attenuated (live, but not virulent; in various combination vaccines). They have been shown to be effective for at least three years. Attenuated FCV vaccine has been shown to possibly cause mild upper respiratory infection. Inactivated vaccine does not, but it causes more local inflammation and possibly predisposes the cat to vaccine-associated sarcoma (due to the adjuvants required to activate the immune system against dead viruses).

The only vaccine licensed for prevention of VS-FCV is CaliciVax, manufactured by Fort Dodge Animal Health, a division of Wyeth. It also contains a strain of the traditional FCV virus. Since VS-FCV has arisen from variant strains of FCV, it is not certain that a vaccine for one virulent strain will protect against all virulent strains.

Quarantine is best for control of FCV in catteries and kennels. However, FCV is very contagious, and latently infected cats will continue to shed viruses, so complete control is difficult. An outbreak of VS-FCV at a humane society in Missouri in 2007 led to the euthanasia of the entire cat population (almost 200 cats) to contain it. FCV may survive several days to weeks in a dry environment and longer in a cooler, wet environment. Quaternary ammonium compounds are not thought to be completely effective, but a 1:32 dilution of household bleach used with a detergent and sufficient contact time does seem to kill the virus.

=== Potential future antivirals ===
Herbal extracts as a source of compounds with an antiviral activity has attracted significant attention recently. Two researches independently published in 2016 screened a library of natural chemicals against FCV. The first one showed that Theaflavin and its derivatives but not Kaempferol significantly inhibited entry of FCV into cells. On the contrary, authors of the second article claimed that kaempherol showed anti-FCV activity, but theaflavin treatment was insufficient. This striking difference may be (at least partially) explained by differences in testing conditions. Indeed, further studies of activity, as well as molecular mechanisms of action, needed.

In early 2026, Japanese researchers published a study of 52 cats with feline chronic gingivostomatitis (stomatitis), all treated with a medication containing moxifloxacin and molnupiravir. Of these 52 cats, 22 had already had tooth extraction before starting the medication. Physical signs (weight, appetite, activity level, grooming behaviour, ptyalism, erythema) were monitored at various time points throughout the study, and all physical signs showed statistically significant improvements with the use of the medication, regardless of whether the cats had prior tooth extraction.

== Use in research ==
Because of the similarity of FCV to norovirus, a common cause of gastroenteritis in humans, FCV has been used as a surrogate for it in research. For instance, studies have been done on the survival of FCV in foodstuffs, the effectiveness of handwashing on FCV removal, and the use of ozone gas to inactivate FCV found in hotel rooms, cruise ship cabins, and healthcare facilities. It is also used in general Caliciviridae research due to its being one of the few of that group of viruses that grows well in vitro.

== See also ==
- Feline vaccination
- Calicivirus
- Limping calici
