= Spirocercidae =

Scientific classification
- Kingdom: Animalia
- Phylum: Nematoda
- Class: Chromadorea
- Order: Rhabditida
- Suborder: Spirurida
- Family: Spirocercidae; Chitwood & Wehr, 1932

Family of roundworms

Spirocercidae is a family of nematodes belonging to the order Rhabditida.

== Genera ==
Genera:

- Ascarops van Beneden, 1873
- Cyathospirura Baylis, 1934
- Didelphonema Wolfgang, 1953
