= Feline viral rhinotracheitis =

Feline herpesvirus

Virus classification
- (unranked): Virus
- Realm: Duplodnaviria
- Kingdom: Heunggongvirae
- Phylum: Peploviricota
- Class: Herviviricetes
- Order: Herpesvirales
- Family: Orthoherpesviridae
- Genus: Varicellovirus
- Species: Varicellovirus felidalpha1

Synonyms
- Felid alphaherpesvirus 1; Felid herpesvirus 1; Feline rhinotracheitis virus

Infectious disease of cats

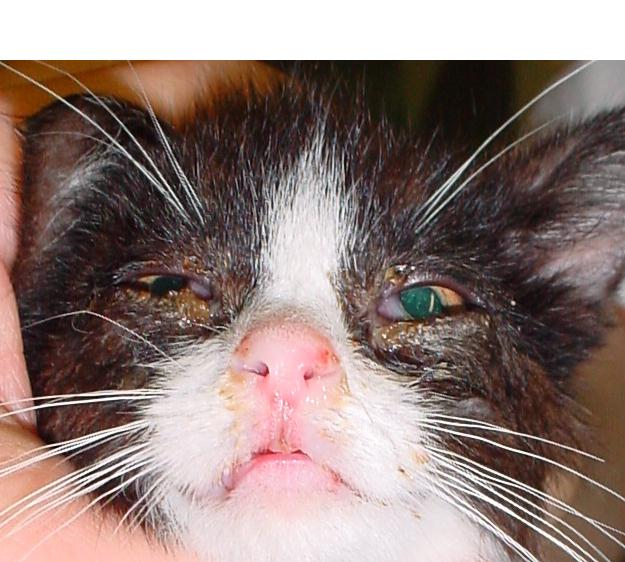
Feline viral rhinotracheitis infection

Feline viral rhinotracheitis (FVR) is an upper respiratory or pulmonary infection of cats caused by Feline herpesvirus, also called Feline herpesvirus 1 (FeHV-1), of the family Herpesviridae. It is also commonly referred to as feline influenza, feline coryza, and feline pneumonia but, as these terms describe other very distinct collections of respiratory symptoms, they are misnomers for the condition. Viral respiratory diseases in cats can be serious, especially in catteries and kennels. Causing one-half of the respiratory diseases in cats, FVR is the most important of these diseases and is found worldwide. The other important cause of feline respiratory disease is feline calicivirus.

FVR is very contagious and can cause severe disease, including death from pneumonia in young kittens. It may cause flat-chested kitten syndrome, but most evidence for this is anecdotal. All members of the family Felidae are susceptible to FVR; in fact, FHV-1 has caused a fatal encephalitis in lions in Germany.

== History ==
FHV-1 was first isolated from cats in 1958 in the United States.

== Transmission ==
FVR is transmitted through direct contact only. It replicates in the nasal and nasopharyngeal tissues and the tonsils. Viremia (the presence of the virus in the blood) is rare. The virus is shed in saliva and eye and nasal secretions, and can also be spread by fomites. FVR has a two- to five-day incubation period. The virus is shed for one to three weeks postinfection. Latently infected cats (carriers) will shed FHV-1 intermittently for life, with the virus persisting within the trigeminal ganglion. Stress and use of corticosteroids precipitate shedding. Most disinfectants, antiseptics and detergents are effective against the virus.

== Clinical signs ==
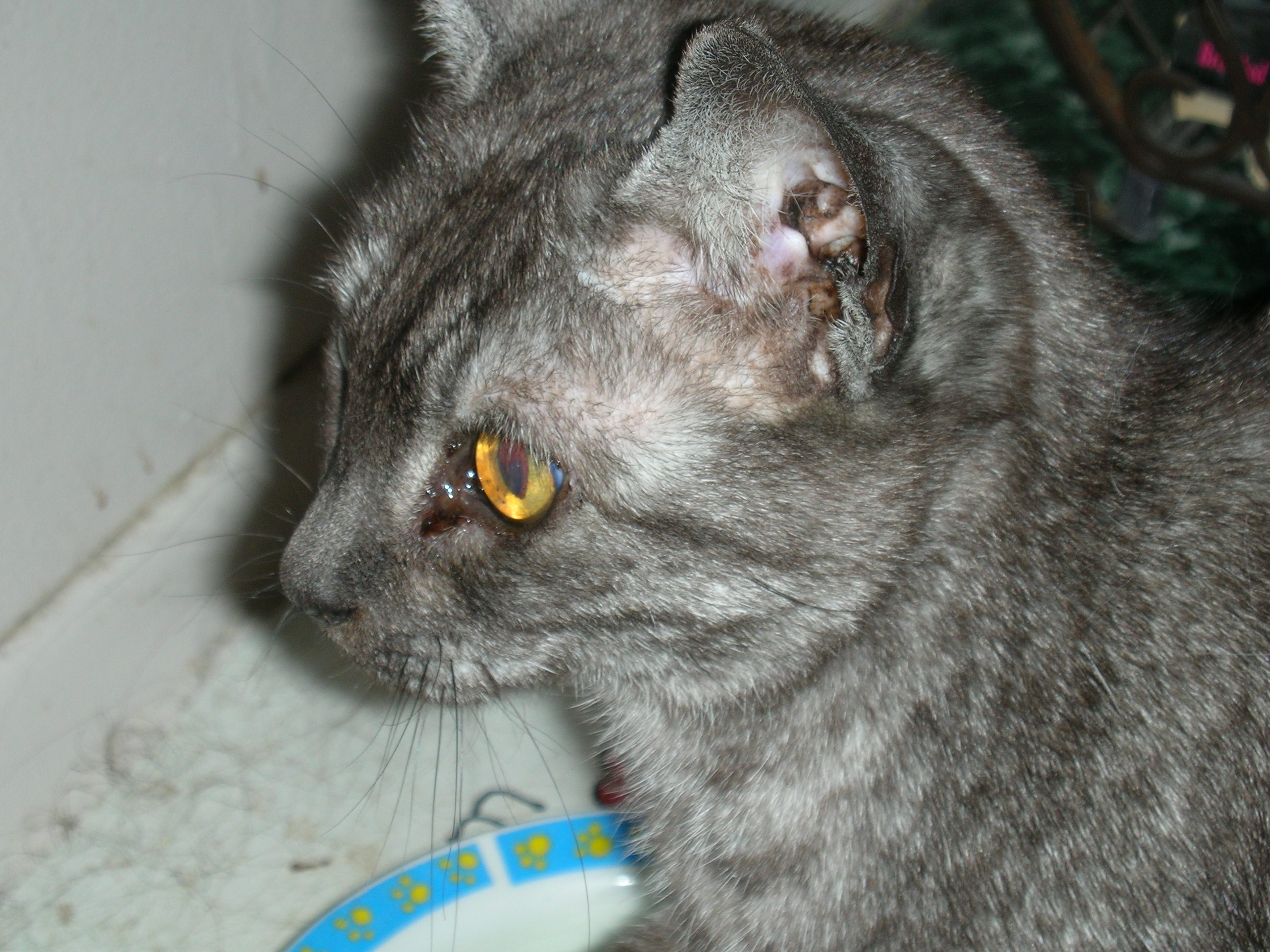
Chronic epiphora in a carrier of FVR

Initial signs of FVR include coughing, sneezing, nasal discharge, conjunctivitis, and sometimes fever (up to 106 °F (41 °C)) and loss of appetite. These usually resolve within four to seven days, but secondary bacterial infections can cause the persistence of clinical signs for weeks. Frontal sinusitis and empyema can also result.

FHV-1 also has a predilection for corneal epithelium, resulting in corneal ulcers, often pinpoint or dendritic in shape. Other ocular signs of FHV-1 infection include conjunctivitis, keratitis, keratoconjunctivitis sicca (decreased tear production), and corneal sequestra. Infection of the nasolacrimal duct can result in chronic epiphora (excess tearing). Ulcerative skin disease can also result from FHV-1 infection. FHV-1 can also cause abortion in pregnant queens, usually at the sixth week of gestation, although this may be due to systemic effects of the infection rather than the virus directly.

In chronic nasal and sinus disease of cats, FHV-1 may play more of an initiating role than an ongoing cause. Infection at an early age may permanently damage nasal and sinus tissue, causing a disruption of ciliary clearance of mucus and bacteria, and predispose these cats to chronic bacterial infections.

== Diagnosis ==
Diagnosis of FVR is usually by clinical signs, especially corneal ulceration. Definitive diagnosis can be done by direct immunofluorescence or virus isolation. However, many healthy cats are subclinical carriers of feline herpes virus, so a positive test for FHV-1 does not necessarily indicate that signs of an upper respiratory tract infection are due to FVR. Early in the course of the disease, histological analysis of cells from the tonsils, nasal tissue, or nictitating membrane (third eyelid) may show inclusion bodies (a collection of viral particles) within the nucleus of infected cells.

== Treatment and prevention ==
Polyprenyl immunostimulant is the only currently-approved treatment in the US for feline rhinotracheitis caused by herpesvirus. Effectiveness was demonstrated in a clinical study with cats experimentally infected with feline herpesvirus: 20 cats were treated with polyprenyl immunostimulant and 20 received a placebo. The study established that the severity of the disease was lower in the group treated with polyprenyl. Safety was demonstrated in 390 personally-owned cats from 2 days to 16 years of age, residing in 10 states.

Antibiotics are commonly used to prevent secondary bacterial infection. There are no specific antiviral drugs in common use at this time for FVR, although one study has shown that ganciclovir, PMEDAP, and cidofovir hold promise for treatment. More recent research has indicated that systemic famciclovir is effective at treating this infection in cats without the side effects reported with other anti-viral agents. More severe cases may require supportive care such as intravenous fluid therapy, oxygen therapy, or even a feeding tube. Conjunctivitis and corneal ulcers are treated with topical antibiotics for secondary bacterial infection. Lysine is commonly used as a treatment; however, in a 2015 systematic review, the authors investigated all clinical trials with cats as well as in vitro studies and concluded that lysine supplementation is likely not effective for the treatment or prevention of feline herpesvirus 1 infection.

=== Vaccine ===
There is a vaccine for FHV-1 available (ATCvet code: QI06AA08 (WHO), plus various combination vaccines), but although it limits or weakens the severity of the viral shedding, it does not prevent infection with FVR. Studies have shown a duration of immunity of this vaccine to be at least three years. The use of serology to demonstrate circulating antibodies to FHV-1 has been shown to have a positive predictive value for indicating protection from this disease. The combination vaccine, Purevax RC, against feline viral rhinotracheitis and feline calicivirus was authorised for medical use in the European Union in February 2005.

=== Preventing spread of virus ===
Most household disinfectants will inactivate FHV-1. The virus can survive up to 18 hours in a damp environment, but less in a dry environment and only shortly as an aerosol.

== See also ==
- Feline vaccination
