= Carlo Maley =

American oncologist

- Born: 1969 (age 56–57)
- Education: Oberlin College – BA in Computer Science and Psychology, 1991 University of Oxford – M.Sc. in Zoology (evolutionary theory), 1993 MIT – PhD in computer science (computational biology), 1998
- Occupation: Professor
- Employer: Arizona State University
- Known for: Cancer Research, Biology
- Website: www.maleylab.com

Carlo C. Maley (born ca 1969) is an American evolutionary biologist and computer scientist researching the evolutionary and ecological processes underlying cancer. Maley is a professor at The Biodesign Institute and the School of Life Sciences at Arizona State University, where he directs the Arizona Cancer and Evolution Center. His research includes cancer evolution, comparative oncology, and evolutionary approaches to cancer treatment.

Maley was the first president of the International Society for Evolution, Ecology and Cancer, co-founder and director of the Center for Evolution and Cancer at UCSF and was a member of the advisory board of the National Evolutionary Synthesis Center (NESCent). He was elected chair-elect of the American Association for Cancer Research (AACR) Cancer Evolution Working Group for 2026-2027. Maley has authored more than 140 peer-reviewed publications with over 22,000 citations.

== Education and career ==
Maley earned a B.A. in computer science and psychology, graduating summa cum laude from Oberlin College in 1991. He was a Marshall Scholar at the University of Oxford, earning his M.Sc. in 1993 in zoology, working with W. D. Hamilton. He then went on to MIT to earn his Ph.D. in computer science in 1998, working with Rodney Brooks and Michael J. Donoghue (then at Harvard), followed by postdoctoral research with Stephanie Forrest, when Maley started working on cancer research.

In 2000, Maley joined Brian J. Reid's lab at the Fred Hutchinson Cancer Research Center, where he started his work on the evolution of Barrett's esophagus. Later, he held faculty positions at the Wistar Institute and the University of California San Francisco, where he directed the Center for Evolution and Cancer from 2011 to 2015. From 2013 to 2019, he served as associate director of the Center for Evolution and Cancer at the Institute of Cancer Research in London.

Maley joined Arizona State University in 2015 and became a full professor in 2022. He directs the Arizona Cancer Evolution Center, established in 2018 with funding from the National Cancer Institute, which comprehends 12 institutions in the USA and Europe.

== Research ==
=== Cancer evolution and ecology ===
The Evo-index and how it changes

Maley’s research applies principles of evolutionary biology and ecology to understand cancer evolution. His work has contributed to establishing cancer as an evolutionary and ecological process, including a framework to characterize tumors attending to properties of that process.

His research on Barrett’s esophagus demonstrated that genetic clonal diversity can predict progression to esophageal adenocarcinoma, helping establish intratumor heterogeneity as a potential prognostic biomarker. He has also investigated somatic evolutionary rates, spatial evolution, and the effects of anti-inflammatory drugs on clonal dynamics of Barrett’s esophagus, and conducted related research in other premalignant diseases like ductal carcinoma in situ.

=== Comparative oncology ===
Maley researches the evolution of cancer resistance across animal species in the context of Peto's Paradox, the observation that, at the species level, the incidence of cancer does not correlate with the number of cells in an organism. His work in this field includes research on the expansion of the tumor supressor gene TP53 in elephants, and several studies of cancer prevalence across different taxa of the animal kingdom.

=== Evolutionary cancer therapies ===
Maley investigates cancer treatment strategies based on evolutionary principles, including adaptive therapy, which seek to manage the tumor cell population by adjusting treatment in response to its dynamics. These strategies draw on integrated pest management in agriculture. Maley’s research includes preclinical investigations of adaptive therapy and collaborations in clinical trials, including a phase II clinical trial at the Mayo Clinic investigating adaptive capecitabine therapy for metastatic breast cancer.

=== Microbial cooperation ===
Maley has also studied evolutionary interactions among microorganisms and between microorganisms and humans, including Kombucha and how the microbiome may influence human food preferences and cravings in ways that benefit their own survival.

=== Science communication and art ===
Maley has promoted the integration of art and science to explore scientific concepts and communicate cancer research, having led projects across visual arts, music, and landscape design. In the visual arts, Maley collaborated with boredomresearch on In Search of Chemozoa. The video installation depicts a fictional organism to explore evolutionary and ecological perspectives on cancer and its treatment. The work was exhibited at the ASU Art Museum and other venues internationally. Maley explored the pedagogical effectiveness of musification through the use of an algorithm that manipulates a piece of music in a manner analogous to the development of cancer. Maley also co-created Endless Forms Most Beautiful, a cactus garden at ASU's Biodesign Institute. The garden features crested cacti whose unusual growth patterns result from developmental mutations, illustrating parallels with cancer and challenging conventional perceptions of the disease.

== Personal life ==
Maley is an enthusiast of tabletop role-playing games, particularly Dungeons & Dragons. His interest in fantasy and world-building has influenced his educational work, including a randomized controlled trial of using fictional species from The Lord of the Rings to teach life history theory and a guidebook applying evolutionary and ecological principles to the creation of fictional species and ecosystems for fantasy literature and role-playing games.
