= Comparative biology =

Study of patterns and natural variation in life

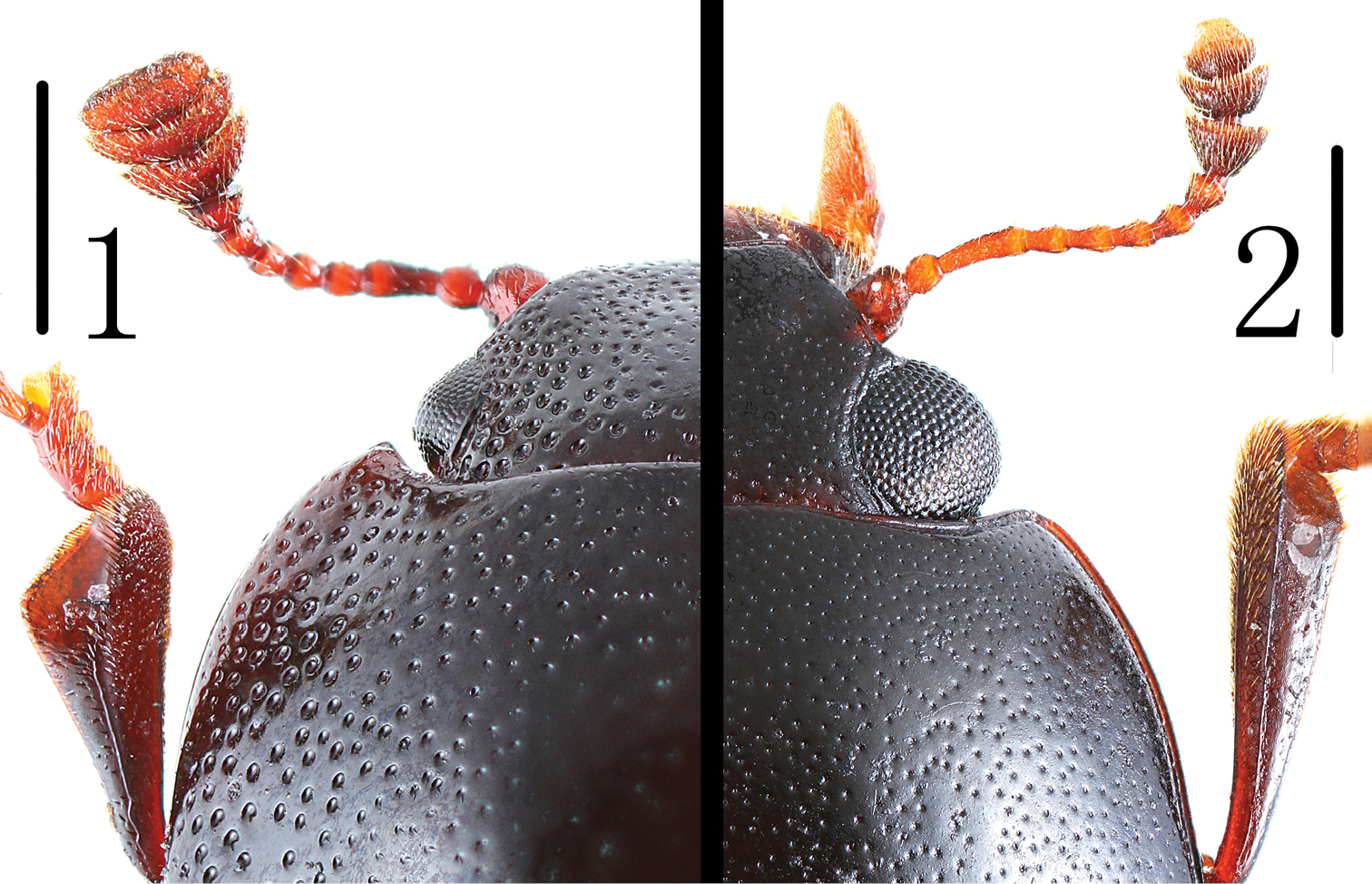
Comparison of the heads of two species from the Erotylidae family of beetles: Scelidopetalon biwenxuani (1) and Amblyopus vittatus (2). Scale bar = 0.5 mm.

Comparative biology is the study of patterns and natural variation in life at all levels, from genes to communities. Comparative biologists take a cross-lineage approach in examining areas such as anatomy. physiology, genomics, developmental biology, bioinformatics, systematics, and biogeography. Comparative evidence from various disciplines may be used to interpret the biological relationships between organisms, as represented by pedigree charts, phylogenetic trees, or cladograms, which in turn helps differentiate features with single origins (homology) from those with multiple origins (homoplasy). On a molecular level, comparative studies often focus on identifying conserved sequences which characterise the functional elements of genes or proteins, though differences may be examined to develop models of evolutionary history or characterise species-specific adaptations. The comparative approach has shaped understandings of the evolution and natural history of populations, species, and higher taxa, and has contributed to the development of evolutionary biology, neontology, paleontology, anthropology, ethology, ecology and many other areas of the biological sciences. Comparative biology also has numerous applications in human health, genetics, biomedicine, and conservation biology.

== History ==
Though now associated with evolutionary biology, comparative approaches have been employed throughout the history of biology and are evident in many of the earliest works of natural history. Among them, Aristotle's biology examined animal anatomies through the lens of the four causes, interpreting structural and functional variation in terms of their formal and teleological causes respectively. Aristotle's works were highly influential to medieval and renaissance natural history, informing interpretive approaches to comparative observations.

Evidence of serial homology was observed as early as the 16th century, as illustrated in Pierre Belon’s L’histoire de la nature des oyseaux (1555), however, the modern study of analogous and homologous structures was first expressed by Richard Owen in his Lectures on the Comparative Anatomy and Physiology of the Invertebrate Animals (1843), while Charles Darwin's theories of descent with modification and evolution by natural selection provided a testable scientific theory of relatedness for interpreting comparative analyses. Darwin made extensive use of comparative evidence throughout The Origin of Species (1859) and The Descent of Man (1871).

== Subdisciplines ==
=== Comparative anatomy ===
Comparative anatomy studies similarities and differences in organisms. The image shows homologous bones in the upper limb of various vertebrates.

Comparative anatomy is a study of similarities and differences in the anatomy of different species. It is closely related to evolutionary biology and phylogeny (the evolution of species).

The science began in the classical era, continuing in the early modern period with work by Pierre Belon who noted the similarities of the skeletons of birds and humans.

Comparative anatomy has provided evidence of common descent, and has assisted in the classification of animals.

=== Comparative physiology ===
Comparative physiology is a subdiscipline of physiology that studies and exploits the diversity of functional characteristics of various kinds of organisms. It is closely related to evolutionary physiology and environmental physiology. Many universities offer undergraduate courses that cover comparative aspects of animal physiology. According to Clifford Ladd Prosser, "Comparative Physiology is not so much a defined discipline as a viewpoint, a philosophy."

=== Comparative genomics ===
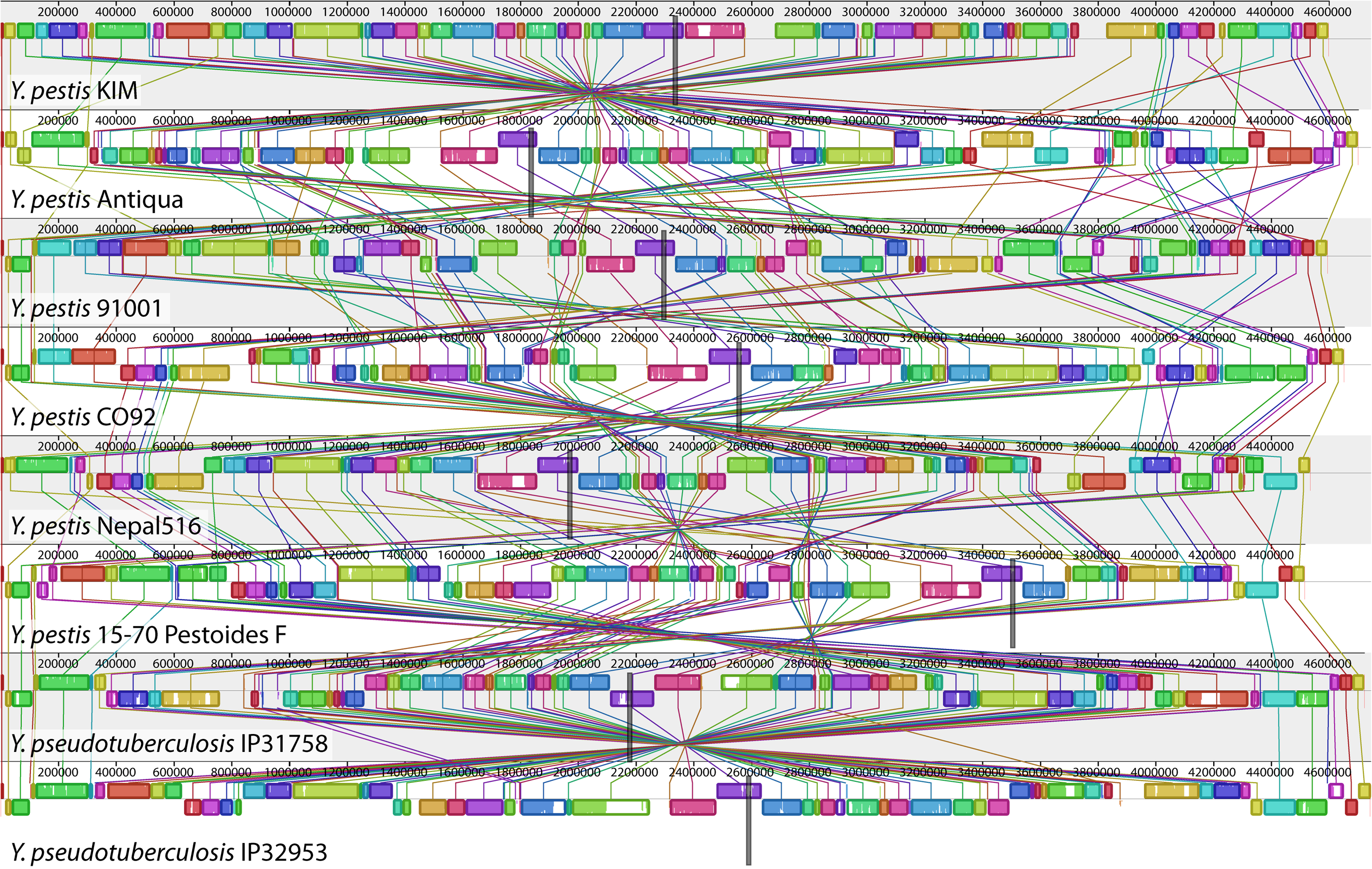
Whole genome alignment is a typical method in comparative genomics. This alignment of eight Yersinia bacteria genomes reveals 78 locally collinear blocks conserved among all eight taxa. Each chromosome has been laid out horizontally and homologous blocks in each genome are shown as identically colored regions linked across genomes. Regions that are inverted relative to Y. pestis KIM are shifted below a genome's center axis.

Comparative genomics is a branch of biological research that examines genome sequences across a spectrum of species, spanning from humans and mice to a diverse array of organisms from bacteria to chimpanzees. This large-scale holistic approach compares two or more genomes to discover the similarities and differences between the genomes and to study the biology of the individual genomes. Comparison of whole genome sequences provides a highly detailed view of how organisms are related to each other at the gene level. By comparing whole genome sequences, researchers gain insights into genetic relationships between organisms and study evolutionary changes. The major principle of comparative genomics is that common features of two organisms will often be encoded within the DNA that is evolutionarily conserved between them. Therefore, Comparative genomics provides a powerful tool for studying evolutionary changes among organisms, helping to identify genes that are conserved or common among species, as well as genes that give unique characteristics of each organism. Moreover, these studies can be performed at different levels of the genomes to obtain multiple perspectives about the organisms.

=== Comparative embryology ===
Comparative embryology is the branch of embryology that compares and contrasts embryos of different species, showing how organisms are interrelated and share common ancestry.

=== Comparative medicine ===
Comparative medicine is a distinct discipline of experimental medicine that uses animal models of human and animal disease in translational and biomedical research. In other words, it relates and leverages biological similarities and differences among species to better understand the mechanism of human and animal disease. It has also been defined as a study of similarities and differences between human and veterinary medicine including the critical role veterinarians, animal resource centers, and Institutional Animal Care and Use Committees play in facilitating and ensuring humane and reproducible lab animal care and use. The discipline has been instrumental in many of humanity's most important medical advances.

==== Comparative oncology ====
Comparative oncology integrates the study of oncology in non-human animals into more general studies of cancer biology and therapy. The field encompasses naturally seen cancers in veterinary patients and the extremely low rates of cancers seen in large mammals such as elephants and whales.

== See also ==
- Comparative psychology
- Comparative neuropsychology
- Cladistics
- Phylogenetic comparative methods
- Comparative Biochemistry and Physiology
- Integrative and Comparative Biology
