= Cancer in cats =

Cancer in cats is the leading cause of death among cats. It is caused by uncontrolled cell growth, and affects a wide range of cell types and organs in the body. Feline cancer initially manifests as a lump or bump on any part of the body. It rapidly grows in the affected cell, attaches itself to the tissue under the skin in that area, and, depending on the tumour, it can spread to other parts of the body. Although cancer accounts for approximately 32% of deaths in cats over ten years old, it can be successfully treated if diagnosed early.

While the causes of cancer in cats are unknown, feline leukaemia virus is suspected to be a prime contributor. Other factors suspected to increase rates of feline cancer include toxins from the environment, passive smoking, excessive grooming, or licking parts of the body that have been in contact with an environmental toxin.

Cancer can be detected at an early stage by observing certain signs and symptoms. Common diagnostic methods include physical examination, x-rays, ultrasounds, cytology, blood tests, urine tests, and nuclear scans. Depending on the type of cancer and its level of progress, surgery, radiation, chemotherapy, or immunotherapy may be used to treat the cancer. Although research into causes and treatment of feline cancers has been slow, there have been advances in radiation therapy, as well as newer and improved chemotherapy procedures.

== Signs and symptoms ==
Cancer in cats can occur in any location or body system, and most symptoms can be detected externally. While each type of cancer has its own distinctive symptoms, most indicate their presence by the occurrence and the prolonged presence of any common symptom. Some of the general symptoms of cancer in cats are:

- Any lump that changes shape or size
- Any sore that does not heal
- Change in bowel or bladder habits
- Difficulty eating or swallowing
- Difficulty urinating or defecating
- Unexplained bleeding or discharge from body
- Loss of appetite
- Chronic weight loss
- Coughing or difficulty breathing
- Stiffness
- Oral odor
- Ravenous hunger

=== Lymphoma and lymphosarcoma ===
Lymphoma is the most common form of cancer in cats, is often associated with feline leukaemia virus, and accounts for 25 percent of all cases. Feline lymphoma usually strikes the digestive system, causing excessive vomiting and diarrhea. Other common symptoms of lymphoma in cats include swollen lymph nodes, loss of appetite, weight loss, and difficulty breathing.

Lymphoma and lymphosarcoma are common among cats with FeLV infections. It affects the intestines and other lymphatic tissues (commonly the abdominal organs). Cats with these cancers may be affected by a loss of appetite, weight loss, vomiting, diarrhea, bloody stool, and constipation.

=== Skin tumours ===
Skin tumours are less common in cats; although most cats are vulnerable, white cats are especially prone to this type of tumour. Skin tumours manifest as a visible lump on the skin, mostly affecting vision, smell, or eating. Benign tumours take several years to develop and are more difficult to detect due to their freely movable nature. The only indicator of benign tumours is self-trauma of a form called lick granuloma or "boredom sores", which can be caused by excessive licking by the cat. This is a sign that the cat is suffering from anxiety.

=== Mammary gland tumours ===
Mammary gland tumours are the third common type of cancer in older female cats, with the most common symptom manifesting as a lump in the breast tissue. Domestic short-haired cats and Siamese appear to have a higher incident rates. The tumour is typically firm and nodular, and adheres to the overlying skin. Nipples may also appear to be red and swollen, oozing yellowish fluid. Despite the overall poor prognosis of feline mammary carcinomas, in one study some cats survived >6 months, indicating that adjuvant treatment may be an option to consider in metastatic disease.

=== Abdominal tumour ===
Abdominal tumour is among the rarest forms of cancer in cats, and most difficult to treat successfully before progressing to an advanced stage. The main symptoms include abdominal enlargement, vomiting (often with blood), weight loss due to poor digestion, and weakness.

== Types of tumour ==
- Adenomas affect sebaceous glands predominantly in the limbs, the eyelids and the head. They are also commonly-found in the ears (and ear canals) of cats and may lead to the development of hyperthyroidism. These adenomas typically appear as cauliflower, wart-like growths with a pink-orange tinge. They can be diagnosed either through their physical appearance or a biopsy testing.
- Fibrosarcomas arise from the fibrous tissues just beneath the skin. They may be present as solitary, irregular masses on the skin. Diagnosis is made through biopsy evaluation which is followed by treatment with surgery, radiation, and chemotherapy.
- Lipomas occur within the fatty tissues and reside as soft, fluctuant round masses that adhere tightly to surrounding tissue (typically to organs and the membrane linings of body cavities). For this type of tumour, surgical removal is the common treatment choice. However, removal is not guaranteed as the tumour sometimes adheres strongly to surrounding muscles and tissues.
- Mastocytoma are the second most common skin tumour in cats. They are usually single nodules in the skin, most commonly on the head and neck; in about one quarter of cats, the nodules become ulcerated. Multiple nodules occur in about 20% of cases.
- Melanomas are not common in cats but when they are, they manifest as basal cell tumours. These tumours are benign in nature, but are firm and raised from the surface of the skin. They are commonly found around the neck, head, ears, and shoulder regions and can be treated through chemotherapy or radiation therapy.
- Myeloproliferative tumours are types of genetic disorders passed through generations. It can affect the bone marrow, white and red blood cells, and platelets. Similar symptoms occur in blood clotting disorders, they include weakness, labored breathing, pale muscus membranes and a loss of appetite. Treatment options for these tumours include chemotherapy, and bone marrow transplants.
- Osteosarcoma are tumours that mainly affect the joints, bones and lungs. Osteosarcoma can lead to swelling, loss in dexterity, coughing, and breathing difficulties. Diagnosis is done by radiographs usually followed by a biopsy. Treating osteosarcoma treatment involves aggressive surgical intervention that may lead to amputation of the affected limb.
- Squamous cell carcinomas affect areas that lack natural pigmentation (oral cavity, tonsils, lips, nose, eyelids, outer earal ear, limbs, toes and nails), or areas that are under constant trauma and irritation. They are diagnosed through biopsy testing. Treatment options include: surgery, cryotherapy, hyperthermia, chemotherapy, and radiation.

== Diagnosis ==
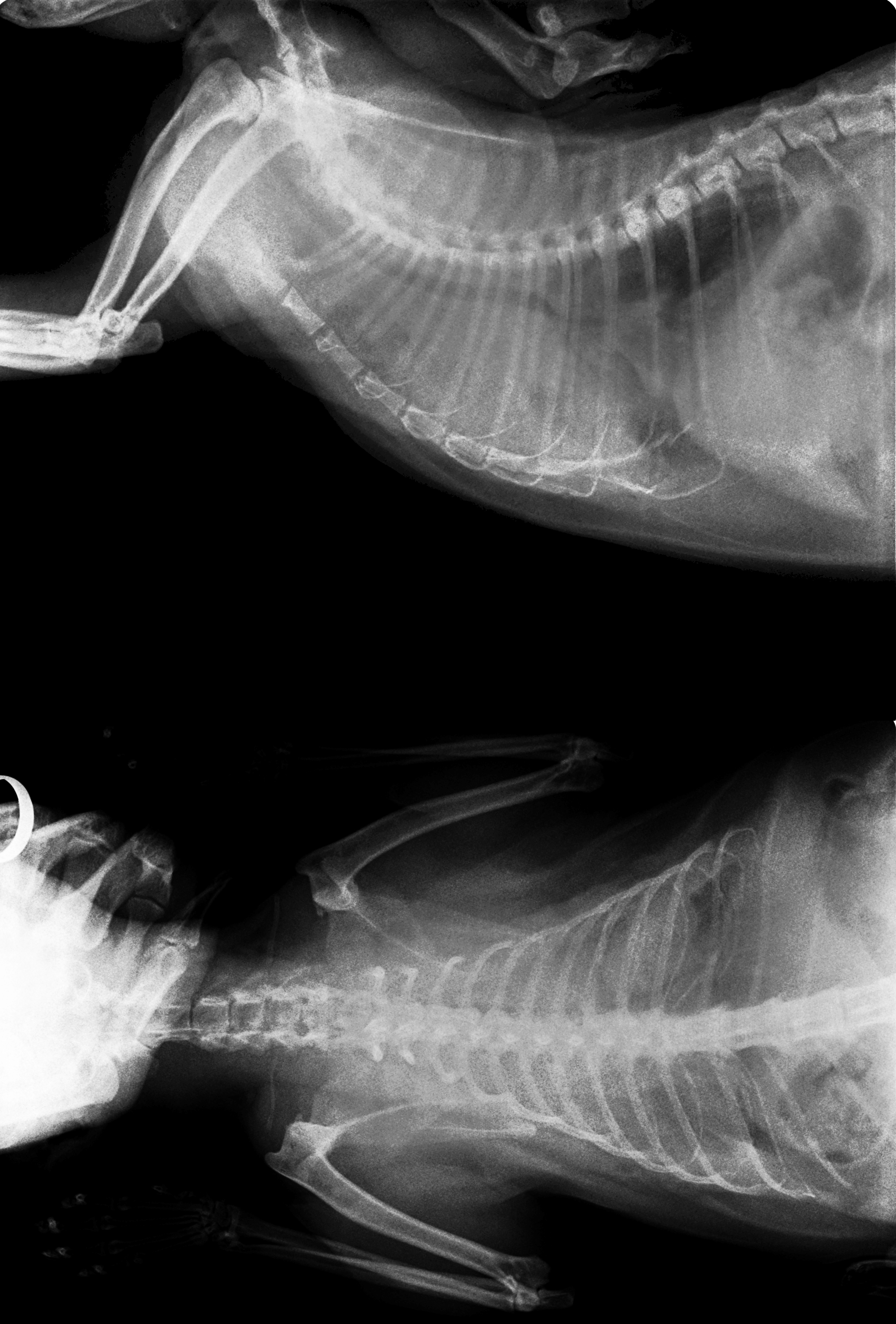
X-ray of FeLV-positive cat with lung cancer

Diagnosing the type of cancer, by the analysis of the structure of the tumour and cancer cells, helps determine the best treatment.

- Physical examination is the most common diagnostic method because typically most tumours can be diagnosed using physical examination with visual observation and manual palpation.
- X-rays may or may not make use of contrast techniques to help visualize the gastrointestinal tract. They are commonly used to identify tumours of the lung, gastrointestinal tract and bladder.
- Ultrasonography is used to visualize internal bodily structures, and can diagnose internal tumours. It is also a way to see internal cysts (which may become tumours) and to see the size and structure of the organs.
- Cytology involves taking cells from the affected area, such as mammary gland secretions, nasal secretions, respiratory secretions, bone marrow and lymph nodes. This is typically the method used for ruling out bumps that may be abscesses, cysts, or granulomas.
- Nuclear scanning is used to view the liver, thyroid, lung, spleen, kidney, and bones.
- Blood tests are completed through microscopic and biochemical analysis. They are completed to confirm or discount suspected cases of feline leukaemia or feline immunodeficiency virus. An immunofluorescent antibody (IFA) test is available for the detection of FeLV in the blood of infected cats.

== Treatment ==
Treatments of cancer in cats usually consists of diagnosis and observation of the tumour to determine its type and size, the development of a treatment plan, the associated goals on the part of the treatment methods, and the regular evaluation of the overall health of the pet.

- Surgery can be utilized if the tumour is localized and accessible, with the goal of removing all malignant cells before any spreading occurs to other regions of the pet. It continues to be the most common choice for treatment of cancer in felines.
- Radiation is used to control or cure cancers provided: the tumour targeted falls in the range suitable for radiation, no radiosensitive organs are involved, and it can be meta-sized. It can be done either internally through implants (brachytherapy), or externally by using radioactive beams (tele-therapy). This destroys the DNA of the cells and ensures reproduction chances are diminished.
- Chemotherapy breaks down the chromosomes of the cell or tumour, so cell division becomes impossible. This stops the affected cells to reproduce or spread to other parts of the body. Side effects include bone marrow depression, nausea, hair loss and hemorrhaging, with a major issue being that it does not work effectively against large tumours.
- Immunotherapy works on the premise that many cancers occur because the organism's immune system is locally suppressed by the cancer cells. It asserts that the tumour would have been eliminated if the tumour microenvironment had not been suppressive. Rather than employing external procedures, it stimulates the animal's own system to fight the cancer. A good example of this methodology is the use of monoclonal antibodies in triggering the body's immune system to fight any cells to which it attaches.

== Prevention ==
The prevention of feline cancer mainly depends on the cat's diet and lifestyle, as well as the detection of early signs and symptoms of cancer before it advances to a further stage. If cancer is detected at an earlier stage, it has a higher chance of being treated, thus improving the chance of survival. Taking cats for regular checkups to the veterinarian can help spot signs and symptoms of cancer early on.

=== Interaction with other cats ===
Interaction with other cats with strains or diseases related to FeLV can be a great risk factor for cats contracting FeLV themselves. Thus a main factor in prevention is keeping the affected cats in quarantine, separated from the unaffected cats. Stray cats, or indoor/outdoor cats have been shown to be at a greater risk for acquiring FeLV, since they have a greater chance of interacting with other cats. Domesticated cats that are kept indoors are the least vulnerable to susceptible diseases.

=== Vaccines ===
Vaccines help the immune system fight off pathogens, which is another key to prevention. A vaccine for feline leukaemia virus was created in 1969.

=== Spaying and neutering ===
Spaying and neutering holds many advantages for cats, including lowering the risk of developing cancer. Neutering male cats makes them less subject to testicular cancer, FeLV, and FIV. Spaying female cats lowers the risk of mammary, ovarian, and uterine cancer, as it prevents them from going into heat. Female cats should be spayed before their first heat, as each cycle of heat creates a greater risk of mammary cancer. Spaying a female cat requires the removal of the ovaries and uterus, which would eliminate their chances of developing cancer in these areas.

=== Exposure to sun ===
The risk of skin cancer increases when a cat is exposed to direct sunlight for prolonged periods. White cats, or cats with white faces and ears, should not be allowed out on sunny days. Depending on climate and time zone, between the hours of 10:00 am to 4:00 pm, it is recommended to keep domesticated cats indoors, as the sun is at its highest peak between these times. Sun block is also available for cats, which can help prevent skin irritation, and a veterinarian should be contacted to find out which brands are appropriate and to use on cats.

=== Exposure to second-hand smoke ===
Cats living in a smoker's household are three times more likely to develop lymphoma. Compared to living in a smoke-free environment, cats exposed to passive smoking also have a greater chance of developing squamous cell carcinoma or mouth cancer. Cancer risk also arises from the cat's grooming habits. As cats lick themselves while they groom, they increase chances of taking in the carcinogens that gather on their fur, which then come into contact with their mucous membranes.

=== Lifestyle ===
Providing a cat with the healthiest lifestyle possible is the key to prevention. Decreasing the amount of toxins, including household cleaning products, providing fresh and whole foods, clean and purified water, and reducing the amount of indoor pollution can help cats live a longer and healthier life. To lessen susceptibility to diseases, domesticated cats should be kept inside the household for most of their lives to reduce the risk of interacting with other cats that could be infected with diseases.

== Research ==
Small animals, like cats, experience faster rates of cancer development. As a result, they are good preclinical models for understanding processes like immortalization and its role in promoting cancerous tumours.

== See also ==
- Nose cancer in cats and dogs
- Skin cancer in cats and dogs
- Vaccine-associated sarcoma
