= Comparative Biochemistry and Physiology D =

- Discipline: Biochemistry, Physiology
- Language: English
- Edited by: Martin Grosell

Publication details
- Publisher: Elsevier
- Impact factor: 2.674 (2020)

Standard abbreviations
- ISO 4: Comp. Biochem. Physiol. D

Indexing
- ISSN: 1744-117X

Links
- Journal homepage

Comparative Biochemistry and Physiology Part D: Genomics and Proteomics is a peer-reviewed scientific journal that covers research in biochemistry and physiology.
