= Comparative Biochemistry and Physiology =

Comparative Biochemistry and Physiology is a series of three journals published by Elsevier with coverage of three aspects of biochemistry and physiology.

These are:

- Comparative Biochemistry and Physiology A, covering Molecular & Integrative Physiology
- Comparative Biochemistry and Physiology B, covering Biochemistry and Molecular Biology
- Comparative Biochemistry and Physiology C, covering Toxicology and Pharmacology
