= Cancer in dogs =

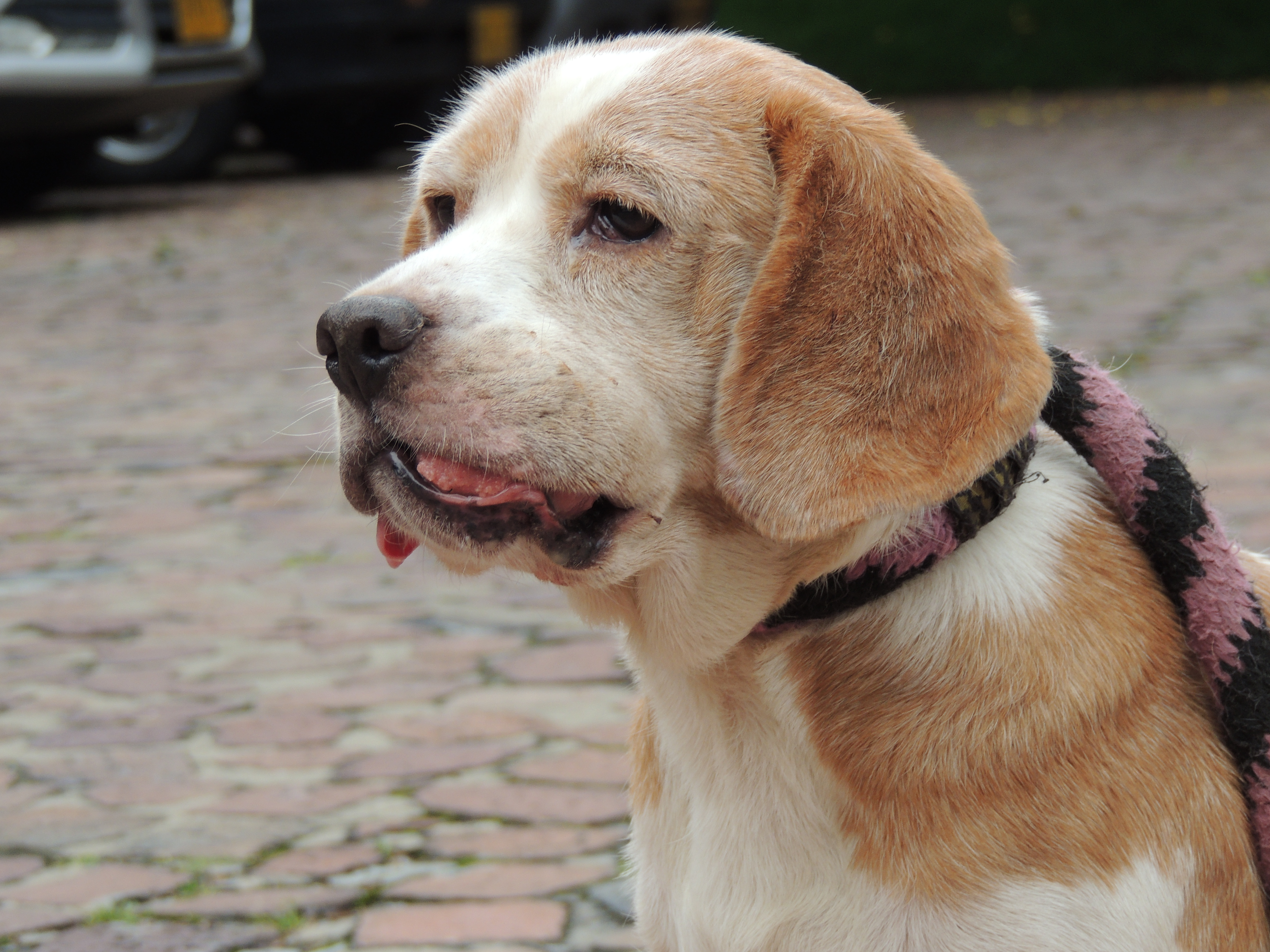
A 10-year-old female beagle with oral cancer

Cancer is the leading cause of death in dogs. It is estimated that 1 in 3 domestic dogs will develop cancer, which is the same incidence of cancer among humans. Dogs can develop a variety of cancers and most are very similar to those found in humans. Dogs can develop carcinomas of epithelial cells and organs, sarcomas of connective tissues and bones, and lymphomas or leukemias of the circulatory system. Selective breeding of dogs has led certain pure-bred breeds to be at high-risk for specific kinds of cancer.

Veterinary oncology is the medical study of cancer in animals, and can be diagnosed and treated by specialized veterinarians called veterinary oncologists.

== Causes ==
Cancer is a complex, multifactorial disease. Carcinogenesis is linked with DNA mutations, chromosomal translocations, dysfunctional proteins, and aberrant cell cycle regulators. Cancer alters the DNA of cells and the mutated genetic material is passed on to daughter cells, resulting in neoplasms. The mutated DNA affects genes involved with the cell cycle, classified as either oncogenes or tumor suppressor genes. Oncogenes are responsible for cell proliferation and differentiation. Oncogenes responsible for cell growth are overexpressed in cancerous cells. Tumor suppressor genes prevent cells with erroneous cell cycles from replicating. Cancer cells ignore cell cycle regulators that control cell growth, division, and death.

The histology of spontaneous tumorigenesis in canines is attributed to the multiplicity and complexity of the disease. The heterogeneity of its development encompasses inherited, epigenetic, and environmental factors.

The selective breeding techniques used with domestic dogs causes certain breeds to be at high risk for specific cancers. Selection for specific phenotypes in dog breeding causes long-range linkage disequilibrium in their DNA. Certain areas of alleles have the tendency to separate less frequently than normal random segregation, which leads to long ranges of repeated DNA sequences. These repeated sequences caused by decreased genetic diversity within breeds, can lead to a high prevalence of certain diseases and especially cancer in breeds. It is believed that the breeding and inbreeding of domesticated canines for specific traits has significantly decreased nucleotide diversity in many pedigree dogs, making certain varieties of canines more susceptible to developing cancer.

== Symptoms ==
Symptoms of cancer in dogs may include:

- Lumps (which are not always malignant, but should always be examined by a vet)
- Swelling
- Persistent sores
- Abnormal discharge from any part of the body
- Bad breath
- Listlessness/lethargy
- Rapid, often unexplained weight loss
- Sudden lameness
- Offensive odor
- Black, tarry stools (a symptom of ulcers, which can be caused by mast cell tumors)
- Decrease in appetite or loss thereof
- Difficulty breathing, urinating or defecating

== Types of cancer ==
Dogs can develop many of the same types of cancer as humans. Many canine cancers are described with the same terminology and use the same classification systems as human cancers.

- Mast cell tumors are the most common type of skin cancer in canines.
- Lymphoma
- Prostate cancer
- Brain cancer

Hemangiosarcoma is a type of cancer that is common in dogs. Hemangiosarcomas form from the cells lining blood vessels (endothelial cells) and can occur all over the body. These tumors can develop on the skin, subcutaneously, or on a blood vessel within an organ and are highly malignant. The tumors are most fatal when they rupture, causing the dog to suffer from severe loss of blood, or hypovolemia.

Dogs are one of three mammalian species that are known to suffer from a transmissible cancer. Canine transmissible venereal tumor (CTVT) is species specific and highly contagious. The cancerous cell lines are transmitted between individuals that are in close contact with each other through acts of intercourse, biting, scratching, or licking. The cancer is prevalent in populations of stray dogs or environments of uncontrolled copulation. The tumors occur around the area of external genitalia and can grow up to 15 cm in area. Canine transmissible venereal tumors can often be infected, ulcerated, and hemorrhagic.

== Susceptibility ==
Cancer prevalence in dogs increases with age and certain breeds are more susceptible to specific kinds of cancers. Millions of dogs develop spontaneous tumors each year. Boxers, Boston Terriers and Golden Retrievers are among the breeds that most commonly develop mast cell tumors. Large and giant breeds, like Great Danes, Rottweilers, Greyhound and Saint Bernards, are much more likely to develop bone cancer than smaller breeds. Lymphoma occurs at increased rates in Bernese Mountain dogs, bulldogs, and boxers. It is important for the owner to be familiar with the diseases to which their specific breed of dog might have a breed predisposition.

A study of 144 female dogs found that dogs eating higher amounts of red meat, especially beef and pork, were more likely to get mammary cancer.

Spayed female dogs are less likely to develop cancers affecting the mammary glands, ovaries, and other reproductive organs. For males, neutering decreases the risk of prostate cancer , but can increase the risk of osteosarcoma and hemangiosarcoma in either sex.

== Treatment ==
A dog undergoing surgery to have a cancerous tumour removed

Treatment options vary and depend on the type and stage of cancer. Common treatments include surgery, chemotherapy, radiation therapy, amputation, and immunotherapy. A combination of therapies may be used. Knowledge and treatment of cancer have increased significantly in the past three decades. Survival rates have also increased due to the increased prevalence of canine cancer treatment centers and breakthroughs in targeted drug development. Canine cancer treatment has become an accepted clinical practice and access to treatment for owners has widely expanded recently. Cancer-targeting drugs most commonly function to inhibit excessive cell proliferation by attacking the replicating cells.

There is one canine tumor vaccine approved by the USDA, for preventing canine melanoma. The Oncept vaccine activates T-cell responses and antibodies against tumor-specific tyrosinase proteins. There is limited information about canine tumor antigens, which is the reason for the lack of tumor-specific vaccines and immunotherapy treatment plans for dogs.

Success of treatment depends on the form and extent of the cancer and the aggressiveness of the therapy. Early detection offers the best chance for successful treatment. The heterogeneity of tumors makes drug development increasingly complex, especially as new causes are discovered. No cure for cancer in canines exist.

Some dog owners opt for no treatment of the cancer at all, in which case palliative care, including pain relief, may be offered. Regardless of how treatment proceeds following a diagnosis, the quality of life of the pet is an important consideration. In cases where the cancer is not curable, there are still many things which can be done to alleviate the dog's pain. Good nutrition and care from the dog's owner can greatly enhance quality of life.

== Prognosis ==
According to Blue Cross, pet owners can expect for their pet to live about 12 months with current treatments. If the owner opts for palliative care instead of treatment, the dog will live about 3 months, although if the tumor is partially removed this can be extended. The survival time may be longer in large dogs, and the cure rate is 20%. If a tumor is completely removed, usually the pet will receive small doses of radiation in hopes of preventing recurrence. The survival rates are: 1 year: 59%, 3 year: 40%, 5 year: 13%.

== See also ==
- Puppy Up Foundation
