= Mr. Nuts =

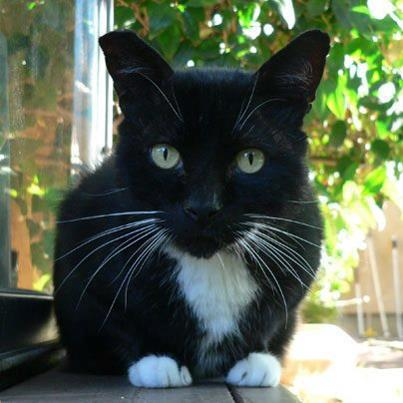
Mr. Nuts

Mr. Nuts was a large, black and white domestic short hair tuxedo cat said to be able to predict the loser of contests such as sporting events and elections through its choice of litter tray.

Mr. Nuts became famous through a November 2012 press release from pet accessories manufacturer Five Pet Place concerning the American presidential election received coverage throughout the United States. It detailed how their cat predicted Mitt Romney to be the loser by using a cat litter box placed to the "right" of one designated for incumbent Barack Obama. Rather than selecting the winner, the box Mr. Nuts "selects" determines the loser.

As a result of the release, Mr. Nuts became a minor internet sensation on election day as his story was picked up by newspapers, television and radio stations while comedian Julie Klausner asked her followers to use #MrNuts in all their political messages on Twitter. He was also listed in a blog entry of unusual celebrity endorsers with Honey Boo Boo, Meat Loaf, Gene Simmons, Martin Sheen, Kim Kardashian, Madonna, Hulk Hogan, Axl Rose and Joss Whedon, which also went viral.

Named after his prominent testicles prior to being castrated, the cat is reported to have successfully chosen the loser of the Pittsburgh Steelers vs. Green Bay Packers, New England Patriots vs. New York Giants and Baltimore Ravens vs. San Francisco 49ers Super Bowls, the sex of the Duke and Duchess of Cambridge's child, and the 2013 America's Cup winner.

The cat was euthanized in March 2014 after diagnosis of intestinal cancer.

== See also ==
- Paul the Octopus
