= Julian Peto =

English statistician and cancer epidemiologist

Julian Peto FRS
- Citizenship: United Kingdom
- Education: Balliol College, Oxford; Imperial College, London
- Known for: log-rank test, Epidemiology of Mesothelioma, HPV and Breast Cancer
- Scientific career
- Fields: Medical Statistics, Epidemiology of Cancer.
- Workplaces: University of Oxford London School of Hygiene and Tropical Medicine

Julian Peto FRS is an English statistician and cancer epidemiologist at the London School of Hygiene and Tropical Medicine. He was Cancer Research UK Chair of Epidemiology at the Institute of Cancer Research from 1983 until 2010. From 1974 to 1983, he worked as a research scientist under Sir Richard Doll at the University of Oxford.

He was educated at Taunton's School in Southampton, Balliol College, Oxford and Imperial College, London. His brother Richard Peto, with whom he has published work in mathematical statistics (see the logrank test), is also a distinguished epidemiologist.

His research interests include the epidemiology of asbestos-induced cancers, the epidemiology and genetics of breast cancer, and HPV screening to prevent cervical cancer.

Peto was elected a Fellow of the Academy of Medical Sciences in 2001 and Fellow of the Royal Society in 2019.
