= Veterinary oncology =

Cancer diagnosis and treatment in animals

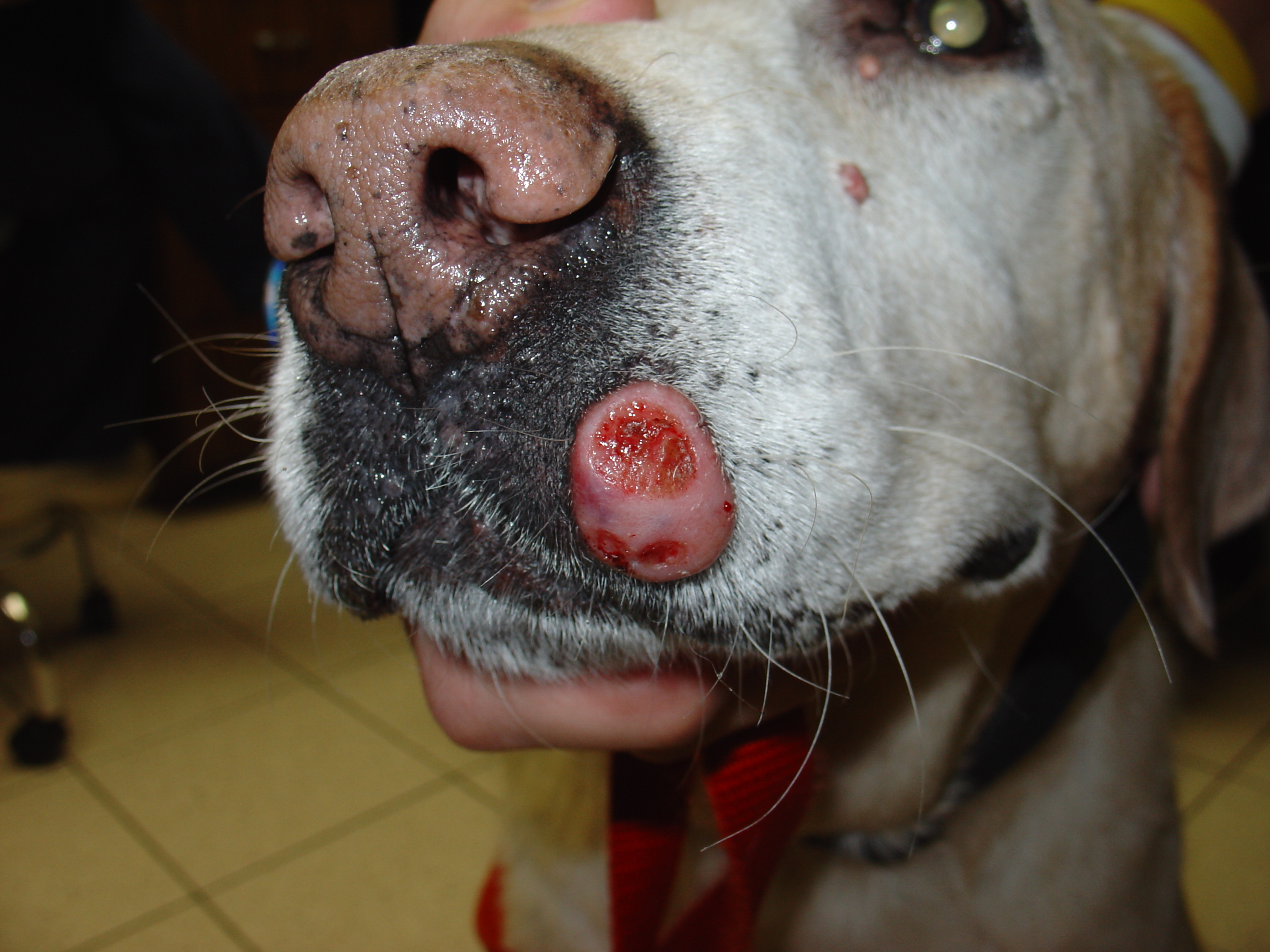
Mast cell tumor on muzzle of dog

Veterinary oncology is a subspecialty of veterinary medicine that deals with cancer diagnosis and treatment in animals. Cancer is a major cause of death in pet animals. In one study, 45% of the dogs that reached 10 years of age or older died of cancer. Veterinary Oncologist are less certain that this statistic is the same in cats, but they believe it to be similar.

Skin tumors are the most frequently diagnosed type of tumor in domestic animals for two reasons: 1. constant exposure of animal skin to the sun and external environment, 2. skin tumors are easy to see because they are on the outside of the animal.

== History ==
Specialised veterinary oncology training became available in the 21st century. The advancements of the practice in the last decade have expanded diagnostic precision as well as treatment. Today, veterinarians can detect cancer earlier by using cell-free DNA profiling with the help of machine learning.

== Treatment ==
The most effective method of treating cancer in animals is surgery. Surgery may involve a marginal excision, where just the capsule is excised; wide excision, where a wider area surrounding the capsule (typically 2–3cm) is excised; or radical excision, where the entire compartment is excised, often taking the form of an amputation.

== Cancer statistics ==
=== Male dogs ===
Type of Cancer	% of Total Cancer
Connective Tissue	17
Testis	16
Skin (Melanoma)	14
Mouth and Throat	10
Lymphoma	10
Bone	4
Stomach and Intestines	3
Nasal cavity	1–2

=== Female dogs ===
Type of Cancer	% of Total Cancer
Breast	51
Connective Tissue	9
Mouth and Throat	8
Skin (Melanoma)	6
Lymphoma	5
Liver and Bile Tracts/ducts	2
Bone	2

These statistics, being from the 1960s, may not be an accurate representation of cancer in dogs currently.

== Human-animal cancer connections ==
Companion animals such as dogs and cats suffer from many of the same types of cancer as humans. Cancer research with dogs has helped in the design of clinical trials for cancer therapy for humans. In the spirit of the One Health movement (global collaborative research on human and animal health) such human-animal connections in cancer research could benefit both humans and animals with cancer in the future.

Animals with cancer also sometimes function as animal sentinels that provide an early warning of carcinogens and an environmental health hazard to humans.

== Ethical issues ==
Veterinarians use the HHHHHMM Scale to discuss animal quality of life with pet owners before a euthanasia decision is made for a pet with an incurable disease such as cancer (the letters stand for Hurt Hunger Hydration Hygiene Happiness Mobility and "More good days than bad days").

== Veterinary Oncologist Specialization ==
Veterinarians have to follow a distinct process when looking to specialize. Veterinarians must complete undergrad, veterinary school, and either spend 1-3 years in general practice or do a year long internship before applying for residency. During this time, they get in depth education on the nature of cancer and what it does. When they apply for residency to practice, they must pass a test to earn a certification clearing them to practice in the specialization.

== See also ==
- Cancer in dogs
  - List of cancers in dogs
- Cancer in cats

Specific cancers

- Skin cancer in cats and dogs
- Bladder cancer in cats and dogs
- Bone cancer in cats and dogs
- Intestinal cancer in cats and dogs
- Nose cancer in cats and dogs
- Stomach cancer in cats and dogs
- Soft tissue sarcoma in cats and dogs
- Lymphoma in animals
