= Torsten O. Nielsen =

Canadian clinician scientist

Torsten O. Nielsen is a Canadian clinician scientist and pathologist. He is a professor of Pathology and Laboratory Medicine at the University of British Columbia. His research focuses on translational cancer genomics, biomarker development, and molecular diagnostics, primarily in sarcomas and breast cancer.

He is an elected Fellow of the Royal Society of Canada and Canadian Academy of Health Sciences.

== Early life and education ==
Nielsen was born and raised in North Vancouver, British Columbia, Canada. He completed a Bachelor of Science in biochemistry with first class honours at the University of British Columbia in 1991, followed by the MD/PhD program at McGill University, where he earned his PhD in Experimental Medicine in 1996 and his MD in 1997.

After completing a combined MD/PhD at McGill, he pursued further training in England, at Stanford, and at the Cleveland Clinic, before becoming a clinician-scientist and surgical pathologist with a specialization in sarcomas and breast cancer.

== Career ==
Nielsen began his academic career at UBC in 2002, joining the Department of Pathology and Laboratory Medicine and affiliated with Vancouver General Hospital and the BC Cancer.

He progressed from Assistant Professor to Full Professor by 2012. As a clinician scientist, he combines subspecialty work in musculoskeletal pathology including diagnosis of connective tissue neoplasms and sarcomas with active translational research aimed at improving cancer diagnostics and treatments.

He serves as Director of the UBC MD/PhD Program, where he mentors and trains physician scientists. Nielsen has also contributed to planning for cancer clinical trials in collaboration with groups such as the Canadian Cancer Trials Group, and previously with the Alliance for Clinical Trials in Oncology, enhancing the integration of pathology in trial design and biomarker studies. He has chaired the Research Committee of the Connective Tissue Oncology Society and served on its board of directors. He has co chaired the International Ki67 in Breast Cancer Working Group and held leadership roles in breast cancer and sarcoma committees of the Canadian Cancer Trials Group.

== Research ==
His work aims to translate genomic discoveries into clinical applications that improve diagnosis, risk stratification, and treatment decisions.

In sarcoma research, Nielsen has helped develop novel diagnostic tests for synovial sarcoma, gastrointestinal stromal tumors and liposarcomas, and has investigated the biology and driver events in tenosynovial giant cell tumor and epithelioid sarcoma. Ongoing work includes characterizing epigenomic landscapes in sarcoma models and advancing precision oncology tools for rare and aggressive soft tissue cancers.

In breast cancer, he played a leading role in developing intrinsic molecular subtyping assays, including pioneering work on the PAM50 gene expression signature, which was translated into the FDA‑cleared Prosigna Breast Cancer Prognostic Gene Signature Assay used worldwide to guide recurrence risk assessments.

== Honors and awards ==
- Fellow of the Royal Society of Canada (2024)
- Fellow of the Canadian Academy of Health Sciences (2023)
- Distinguished Achievement Award for Excellence in Clinical or Applied Research, UBC Faculty of Medicine (2011, 2021).
- Jeremy Jass Prize for Research Excellence in Pathology (2017).
- UBC Killam Research Prize in science (2013).
