= Comparative Biochemistry and Physiology C =

- Discipline: Biochemistry, Physiology
- Language: English
- Edited by: Martin Grosell

Publication details
- Publisher: Elsevier
- Impact factor: 3.228 (2020)

Standard abbreviations
- ISO 4: Comp. Biochem. Physiol. C

Indexing
- ISSN: 1532-0456

Links
- Journal homepage

Comparative Biochemistry and Physiology Part C: Toxicology & Pharmacology is a peer-reviewed scientific journal that covers research in biochemistry and physiology.
