= Real Snail Mail =

Webmail service

- Website type: Webmail service (art project)
- Owners: boredomresearch (Vicky Isley and Paul Smith)
- Creator: boredomresearch
- Website: www.realsnailmail.net
- Commercial: No
- Registration: No
- Launched: 2006

Real Snail Mail is a webmail service created by artists Vicky Isley and Paul Smith a.k.a. boredomresearch, which uses real live snails equipped with Radio Frequency Identification (RFID) tags to deliver electronic messages. The project was commissioned as part of the Tagged Exhibition in Space Media Arts, London in 2006 and was developed during boredomresearchs' research fellowship in the Computer Animation Research Centre at Bournemouth University.

The installation version of Real Snail Mail was displayed at SIGGRAPH08 in Los Angeles (11–15 August 2008), at the British Science Festival (14–19 September 2009), and at [DAM]Berlin as part of boredomresearch's solo exhibition, 'Chasing Stillness' (29 August – 24 October 2009).

== How it works ==
Each snail "agent" is fitted with a RFID tag on its shell. Users of the service send a message via the Real Snail Mail website which is routed to the tank to await collection by a snail "agent". As the snails wander around the tank, they come into range of a RFID reader, which assigns the e-mail message to the RFID tag. The references to the electronic messages are then physically carried around the tank by the snails until one of them passes close to a second reader. As soon as this happens, the second reader triggers the message to be forwarded over the net in the usual way.
