= Richard Peto =

English statistician and epidemiologist (born 1943)

Sir Richard Peto FRS
- Born: 14 May 1943 (age 83)
- Education: Taunton's School
- Alma mater: University of Cambridge (BA); Imperial College London (MSc)
- Known for: Meta-analysis; Peto's paradox; Log-rank test
- Awards: Louis-Jeantet Prize for Medicine (1997); Knight Bachelor (1999); Guy Medal (Silver, 1986); Gairdner Foundation International Award (1992); Prince Mahidol Award (2000); Royal Medal (2002); Weldon Memorial Prize (2003); Heineken Prize for Medicine (2008)
- Scientific career
- Fields: Medical Statistics, Clinical Trials, Epidemiology of Smoking.
- Workplaces: University of Oxford; Green Templeton College, Oxford

Sir Richard Peto FRS (born 14 May 1943) is an English statistician and epidemiologist who is Professor of Medical Statistics and Epidemiology at the University of Oxford, England.

== Education ==
He attended Taunton's School in Southampton and subsequently studied the Natural Sciences Tripos at Trinity College, Cambridge followed by a Master of Science degree in Statistics at Imperial College London.

== Career and research ==
His career has included collaborations with Richard Doll beginning at the Medical Research Council Statistical Research Unit in London. He set up the Clinical Trial Service Unit (CTSU) in Oxford in 1975 and is currently co-director. Peto's paradox is named after him.

=== Awards and honours ===
He was elected a Fellow of the Royal Society in 1989 for his contributions to the development of meta-analysis. He is a leading expert on deaths related to tobacco use. "When Sir Richard Peto began work with the late Richard Doll fifty years ago, the UK had the worst death rates from smoking in the world. Smoking was the cause of more than half of all premature deaths of British men." He was elected a Fellow of the Academy of Medical Sciences (FMedSci) in 1998. He was knighted for his services to epidemiology and to cancer prevention in 1999, and he received an honorary Doctor of Medical Sciences degree from Yale University in 2011.

== Personal life ==
His brother Julian Peto, with whom he has published work in mathematical statistics (e.g. on the logrank test), is also a distinguished epidemiologist.

== Selected publications ==
- Gribbin, B; Pickering, TG; Sleight, P; Peto, R (October 1971). "Effect of age and high blood pressure on baroreflex sensitivity in man". Circ. Res. 29 (4): 424–31. doi:10.1161/01.res.29.4.424. PMID 5110922.
- Peto, R; Peto, J (1972). "Asymptotically efficient rank invariant test procedures". J R Stat Soc Ser A. 135 (2): 185–207. doi:10.2307/2344317. hdl:10338.dmlcz/103602. JSTOR 2344317.
- Doll, R; Peto, R (December 1976). "Mortality in relation to smoking: 20 years' observations on male British doctors". Br Med J. 2 (6051): 1525–36. doi:10.1136/bmj.2.6051.1525. PMC 1690096. PMID 1009386.
- Peto, R; Pike, MC; Armitage, P; Breslow, NE; Cox, DR; Howard, SV; Mantel, N; McPherson, K; Peto, J; Smith, PG (December 1976). "Design and analysis of randomized clinical trials requiring prolonged observation of each patient. I. Introduction and design". Br J Cancer. 34 (6): 585–612. doi:10.1038/bjc.1976.220. PMC 2025229. PMID 795448.
- Peto, R; Pike, MC; Armitage, P; Breslow, NE; Cox, DR; Howard, SV; Mantel, N; McPherson, K; Peto, J; Smith, PG (January 1977). "Design and analysis of randomized clinical trials requiring prolonged observation of each patient. II. Analysis and examples". Br J Cancer. 35 (1): 1–39. doi:10.1038/bjc.1977.1. PMC 2025310. PMID 831755.
- Peto, R; Doll, R; Buckley, JD; Sporn, MB (March 1981). "Can dietary beta-carotene materially reduce human cancer rates?". Nature. 290 (5803): 201–8. Bibcode:1981Natur.290..201P. doi:10.1038/290201a0. PMID 7010181. S2CID 43042899.
- Doll, R; Peto, R (June 1981). "The causes of cancer: quantitative estimates of avoidable risks of cancer in the United States today". J Natl Cancer Inst. 66 (6): 1191–308. doi:10.1093/jnci/66.6.1192. PMID 7017215. S2CID 36210635.
- Peto R, Schneiderman M, eds. Quantification of occupational cancer. Cold Spring Harbor, NY: Cold Spring Harbor Laboratory, 1981. ISBN 0-87969-208-1.
- Yusuf, S; Peto, R; Lewis, J; Collins, R; Sleight, P (March–April 1985). "Beta blockade during and after myocardial infarction: an overview of the randomized trials". Prog Cardiovasc Dis. 27 (5): 335–71. doi:10.1016/S0033-0620(85)80003-7. PMID 2858114.
- Peto R, zur Hausen H, eds. Viral etiology of cervical cancer. Cold Spring Harbor, NY: Cold Spring Harbor Laboratory, 1986. ISBN 0-87969-221-9.
- MacMahon, S; Peto, R; Cutler, J; Collins, R; Sorlie, P; Neaton, J; Abbott, R; Godwin, J; Dyer, A; Stamler, J (March 1990). "Blood pressure, stroke, and coronary heart disease. Part 1, Prolonged differences in blood pressure: prospective observational studies corrected for the regression dilution bias". Lancet. 335 (8692): 765–74. doi:10.1016/0140-6736(90)90878-9. PMID 1969518. S2CID 25998460.
- Collins, R; Peto, R; MacMahon, S; Hebert, P; Fiebach, NH; Eberlein, KA; Godwin, J; Qizilbash, N; Taylor, JO; Hennekens, CH (April 1990). "Blood pressure, stroke, and coronary heart disease. Part 2, Short-term reductions in blood pressure: overview of randomised drug trials in their epidemiological context". Lancet. 335 (8693): 827–38. doi:10.1016/0140-6736(90)90944-Z. PMID 1969567. S2CID 11916390.
- Peto R, Imperial Cancer Research Fund (Great Britain), World Health Organization, et al. Mortality from smoking in developed countries, 1950–2000: indirect estimates from national vital statistics. Oxford and New York: Oxford University Press, 1994. ISBN 0-19-262619-1.
- Hennekens, CH; Buring, JE; Manson, JE; Stampfer, M; Rosner, B; Cook, NR; Belanger, C; LaMotte, F; Gaziano, JM; Ridker, PM; Willett, W; Peto, R (May 1996). "Lack of effect of long-term supplementation with beta carotene on the incidence of malignant neoplasms and cardiovascular disease". N Engl J Med. 334 (18): 1145–9. doi:10.1056/NEJM199605023341801. PMID 8602179. S2CID 17357275.
- Thun, MJ; Peto, R; Lopez, AD; Monaco, JH; Henley, SJ; Heath, CW Jr; Doll, R (December 1997). "Alcohol consumption and mortality among middle-aged and elderly U.S. adults". N Engl J Med. 337 (24): 1705–14. doi:10.1056/NEJM199712113372401. PMID 9392695.
- Danesh, J; Collins, R; Appleby, P; Peto, R (May 1998). "Association of fibrinogen, C-reactive protein, albumin, or leukocyte count with coronary heart disease: meta-analyses of prospective studies". JAMA. 279 (18): 1477–82. doi:10.1001/jama.279.18.1477. PMID 9600484.
- Peto, R; Darby, S; Deo, H; Silcocks, P; Whitley, E; Doll, R (August 2000). "Smoking, smoking cessation, and lung cancer in the UK since 1950: combination of national statistics with two case-control studies". BMJ. 321 (7257): 323–9. doi:10.1136/bmj.321.7257.323. PMC 27446. PMID 10926586.
- Collins, R; Armitage, J; Parish, S; Sleigh, P; Peto, R; Heart Protection, Study Collaborative Group (June 2003). "MRC/BHF Heart Protection Study of cholesterol-lowering with simvastatin in 5963 people with diabetes: a randomised placebo-controlled trial". Lancet. 361 (9374): 2005–16. doi:10.1016/S0140-6736(03)13636-7. PMID 12814710. S2CID 28111189.
- Halliday, A; Mansfield, A; Marro, J; Peto, C; Peto, R; Potter, J; Thomas, D (May 2004). "Prevention of disabling and fatal strokes by successful carotid endarterectomy in patients without recent neurological symptoms: randomised controlled trial". Lancet. 363 (9420): 1491–502. doi:10.1016/S0140-6736(04)16146-1. hdl:11379/640485. PMID 15135594. S2CID 22814764.
- Doll, R; Peto, R; Boreham, J; Sutherland, I (June 2004). "Mortality in relation to smoking: 50 years' observations on male British doctors". BMJ. 328 (7455): 1519. doi:10.1136/bmj.38142.554479.AE. PMC 437139. PMID 15213107.
- Baigent, C; Keech, A; Kearney, PM; Blackwell, L; Buck, G; Pollicino, C; Kirby, A; Sourjina, T; Peto, R; Collins, R; Simes, R (October 2005). "Efficacy and safety of cholesterol-lowering treatment: prospective meta-analysis of data from 90,056 participants in 14 randomised trials of statins". Lancet. 366 (9493): 1267–78. doi:10.1016/S0140-6736(05)67394-1. PMID 16214597. S2CID 10716362.
- Clarke, M; Collins, R; Darby, S; Davies, C; Elphinstone, P; Evans, E; Godwin, J; Gray, R; Hicks, C; James, S; MacKinnon, E; McGale, P; McHugh, T; Peto, R; Taylor, C; Wang, Y; Early Breast, Cancer Trialists' Collaborative Group (December 2005). "Effects of radiotherapy and of differences in the extent of surgery for early breast cancer on local recurrence and 15-year survival: an overview of the randomised trials". Lancet. 366 (9503): 2087–106. doi:10.1016/S0140-6736(05)67887-7. PMID 16360786. S2CID 14628726.
