= Puppy Up Foundation =

Charitable corporation in Memphis dedicated to comparative oncology

The Puppy Up Foundation is a charitable corporation under section 501 c (3), registered in Memphis, Tennessee. Also known as Companions against Cancer and 2 Million Dogs, the organization studies the links between cancers in humans and dogs using comparative oncology research. The foundation seeks to raise awareness about canine cancer as well as educate, empower, mobilize, and promote investment in comparative oncology research.

== History ==
In January 2008, Luke Robinson, who is from Texas, and his two dogs made a cross-country journey in honor of his Great Pyrenees, Malcolm, who died of bone cancer in 2004. He walked his two other dogs, Hudson and Murphy, from Austin, Texas to Boston, Massachusetts, town to town, to educate others on canine cancer. They started a nationwide grassroots movement. "Mr. Robinson had a vision: 2,000,000 dogs walking simultaneously all across the United States for cancer. If two dogs could walk over 2,000 miles, surely it was possible!" A month after arriving in Boston, his dog Murphy was diagnosed with nasal cancer and died a year and three days later, which only strengthened his resolve.

== Canine cancer ==
Along with humans, companion animals can develop cancer too. They can get brain, breast, bone, lung cancer; lymphoma and melanoma, as well as others. Scientists have discovered that the cells are biologically comparable. With comparative oncology studies, more companion animals have access to the drug candidates available. The National Canine Cancer Foundation has a list of canine cancers.

== Puppy Up! walks ==
Puppy Up! walks are 2 mile walks that fundraise for cancer research as well as promote awareness of canine cancers. Members from the community where a walk is being held are able to volunteer at the event by helping set up and other tasks for the event. The people of the community are also able to register their canine companion for the walk itself, as well as donate and participate in a silent auction that helps raise money also.
