= Comparative Biochemistry and Physiology A =

- Discipline: Biochemistry, Physiology
- Language: English
- Edited by: Michael Hedrick

Publication details
- Publisher: Elsevier
- Impact factor: 2.320 (2020)

Standard abbreviations
- ISO 4: Comp. Biochem. Physiol. A

Indexing
- ISSN: 1095-6433

Links
- Journal homepage

Comparative Biochemistry and Physiology Part A: Molecular & Integrative Physiology is a peer-reviewed scientific journal that covers research in biochemistry and physiology.
