= Peto's paradox =

Observation concerning cancer rates

Peto's paradox is the observation that, at the species level, the incidence of cancer does not appear to correlate with the number of cells in an organism. For example, the incidence of cancer in humans is much higher than the incidence of cancer in whales, despite a whale having about 1000 times more cells than a human. If the probability of carcinogenesis were constant across cells, one would expect whales to have a higher incidence of cancer than humans. Peto's paradox is named after English statistician and epidemiologist Richard Peto, who first observed the connection.

== History ==
Peto first formulated the paradox in 1977. Writing an overview of the multistage model of cancer, Peto noted that, on a cell-for-cell basis, humans were much less susceptible to cancer than mice. Peto went on to suggest that evolutionary considerations were likely responsible for varying per-cell carcinogenesis rates across species.

== Same species ==
Within members of the same species, cancer risk and body size appear to be positively correlated, even once other risk factors are controlled for.

A 25-year longitudinal study of 17,738 male British civil servants, published in 1998, showed a positive correlation between height and cancer incidence with a high degree of statistical confidence, even after risk factors like smoking were controlled for. A similar 2011 study of more than one million British women found strong statistical evidence of a relationship between cancer and height, even after controlling for a number of socioeconomic and behavioral risk factors. A 2011 analysis of the causes of death of 74,556 domesticated North American dogs found that cancer incidence was lowest in the smaller breeds, confirming the results of earlier studies.

== Across species ==
Across species, however, the relationship breaks down. In a 2015 study, the San Diego Zoo surveyed results from 36 different mammalian species, ranging in size from the 51-gram striped grass mouse to the 4,800-kilogram elephant, which is nearly 100,000 times larger. The study found no statistically significant relationship between body size and cancer incidence, offering empirical support for Peto's initial observation.

== Evolutionary considerations ==
The evolution of multicellularity has required the suppression of cancer to some extent, and connections have been found between the origins of multicellularity and cancer. In order to build larger and longer-lived bodies, organisms required greater cancer suppression. Evidence suggests that large organisms such as elephants have more adaptations that allow them to evade cancer. The reason that intermediate-sized organisms have relatively few of these genes may be because the advantage of preventing cancer these genes conferred was, for moderately-sized organisms, outweighed by their disadvantages—particularly reduced fertility.

Various species have evolved different mechanisms for suppressing cancer. A paper in Cell Reports in January 2015 claimed to have found genes in the bowhead whale (Balaena mysticetus) that may be associated with longevity. Around the same time, a second team of researchers identified a polysaccharide in the naked mole-rat that appeared to block the development of tumors. In October 2015, two independent studies showed that African elephants have 20 copies of tumor suppressor gene TP53 in their genome, Asian elephants have 15 to 20, where humans and other mammals have only one. Additional research showed 14 copies of the gene present in the DNA of preserved mammoths, but only one copy of the gene in the DNA of manatees and hyraxes, the elephant's closest living relatives. The TP53 tumor suppressor gene specifies a protein that senses damaged sites in DNA, or a cell experiencing stress. The TP53 protein then either slows the growth of the cell for a brief period during which DNA damage is repaired, or it triggers cell death (apoptosis) if the damage is overwhelming. Enhanced capability to repair DNA damage may explain the observed cancer suppression in elephants. The results suggest an evolutionary relationship between animal size and tumor suppression, as Peto had theorized.

== Metabolic and cell size considerations ==
A 2014 paper in Evolutionary Applications by Maciak and Michalak emphasized what they termed "a largely underappreciated relation of cell size to both metabolism and cell-division rates across species" as key factors underlying the paradox, and concluded that "larger organisms have bigger and slowly dividing cells with lower energy turnover, all significantly reducing the risk of cancer initiation."

Maciak and Michalak argue that cell size is not uniform across mammalian species, making body size an imperfect proxy for the number of cells in an organism. (For example, the volume of an individual red blood cell of an elephant is roughly four times that of one from a common shrew.) Furthermore, larger cells divide more slowly than smaller ones, a difference which compounds exponentially over the life-span of the organism. Fewer cell divisions means fewer opportunities for cancer mutations, and mathematical models of cancer incidence are highly sensitive to cell-division rates. Additionally, the basal metabolic rates of larger animals are generally lower, following a well-defined inverse logarithmic relationship, which is typically associated with reduced oxidative stress. Consequently, their cells will incur less damage over time per unit of body mass. Combined, these factors may explain much of the apparent paradox.

== Medical research ==
Large animals' apparent ability to suppress cancer across vast numbers of cells has spurred an active medical research field.

In one experiment, laboratory mice were genetically altered to express "always-on" active TP53 tumor antigens ("always on" meaning they do not get deactivated by the MDM2 gene), similar to the ones found in elephants. The mutated mice exhibited increased tumor suppression ability, but also showed signs of premature aging.

Another study placed p53 under normal regulatory control and did not find signs of premature aging. It is assumed that under its native promoter p53 does not cause premature aging, unlike constitutively expressed p53.

== See also ==
- Comparative oncology
- Metabolic theory of ecology
- Tumor suppressor gene
