= Nose cancer in cats and dogs =

The most common type of cancers affecting the animal's nose are carcinomas and sarcomas, both of which are locally invasive. The most common sites for metastasis are the lymph nodes and the lungs, but can also include other organs.

== Signs and symptoms ==
Signs vary but may include bleeding from the nose, nasal discharge, facial deformity from bone erosion and tumor growth, sneezing, or difficulty breathing.

== Diagnosis ==
Standard X-rays are still acceptable and readily accessible imaging tools but their resolution and level of anatomical detail are not as good as for computed tomography (CT) scan. In order to definitively confirm cancer in the nasal cavity, a tissue biopsy should be obtained.

== Treatment ==
Radiation therapy has become the preferred treatment. Its advantage is that it treats the entire nasal cavity together with the affected bone and has shown the greatest improvement in survival. The radiation therapy is typically delivered in 10-18 treatment sessions over the course of 2–4 weeks.

Radiation therapy has a multitude of accompanying side effects and should be recommended on a case-by-case basis. Dogs in which nose bleeds are observed have an average life expectancy of 88 days. In instances where nosebleeds are not seen, the prognosis is slightly less grim. On average, a dog with nasal cancer has a life expectancy of 95 days.
