= Boredomresearch =

boredomresearch was created by British artists Vicky Isley and Paul Smith. While working with digital media, the artists give form to unseen aspects of the biological world. This fascination with digital tools as a means to explore, experiment and interpret the mechanics that escape immediate perception creates a strong synergy with scientific disciplines. Much of their artwork centres on advancing understanding of the interactions between human culture and its sustaining environment. Their projects have explored topics such as speed, brain activity and diseases.

== Selected works ==
- Possessed (2001): A web project which used simple a-life technology to engage an online audience with a synthesised supernatural experience.
- Ornamental Bug Garden 001 (2004): Digital artwork including artificial life creatures inspired by springtails whose behaviour generates a sound composition.
- Biomes (2005): Ecology of digital creatures that evolves elaborate markings over time.
- Wish (2006): An alternative online forum inspired by the Lam Tsuen Wishing Trees in Hong Kong.
- Real Snail Mail (2008–ongoing): Webmail service using live snails equipped with radio frequency identification (RFID) tags to deliver electronic messages.
- Lost Calls of Cloud Mountain Whirligigs (2009): Flying bots with ever-changing propeller patterns that sing melancholic songs.

== Collections ==
boredomresearch's Ornamental Bug Garden 001 can be found in the British Council's collection in London.

== Awards ==
boredomresearch's artwork Ornamental Bug Garden 001 (2004) was awarded an honorary mention in VIDA 7.0 International A-Life Electronic Arts Competition, Madrid in 2004 and Transmediale, Berlin, 2005. In 2005 boredomresearch were shortlisted for The Arts Foundation, New Media Art Fellowship Award.

== Exhibitions ==
boredomresearch's work has been exhibited at Itaú Cultural in São Paulo; iMAL, a center for digital cultures & technology in Brussels; Montevideo in Amsterdam; Transmediale Festival in Berlin; SIGGRAPH art show in Los Angeles (2005 & 2008) and in Boston (2006); Space Media Arts, London; and [DAM]Berlin.

boredomresesearch had a solo national touring exhibition Theatre of Restless Automata (2005–06) funded by the Arts Council of England. The exhibition toured to Aspex Gallery in Portsmouth, HTTP in London and Peterborough Digital Arts.
