= Skin sarcoma =

Human disease

Kaposi's sarcoma

Skin sarcomas (cutaneous sarcomas, dermal sarcomas, or sarcomas of skin) are a subset of soft tissue sarcomas. Skin sarcomas are tumors on the surface of or inside the dermal layers (skin). They are small in size compared to other sarcomas which can arise inside muscles, abdominal cavity, retroperineal sites, etc. These sarcomas are rare, but potentially fatal.

Some types of sarcoma that can manifest on the skin include:

- Angiosarcoma
- Dermatofibrosarcoma protuberans
- Fibroxanthoma
- Kaposi's sarcoma
- Leiomyosarcoma
- Pleomorphic dermal sarcoma
- Reticulum cell sarcoma of skin
