= Martin Grosell =

Danish-American marine physiologist

- Born: June 14, 1967 (age 59); Roskilde, Denmark
- Citizenship: Danish-American
- Education: University of Copenhagen
- Known for: Research on fish physiology, ichthyocarbonates, the marine carbon cycle, and crude oil toxicity
- Scientific career
- Fields: Marine biology, physiology, toxicology
- Workplaces: University of Miami

Martin Grosell (born June 14, 1967) is a Danish-American marine physiologist and professor at the University of Miami's Rosenstiel School of Marine, Atmospheric, and Earth Science. His research focuses on comparative physiology and toxicology in aquatic animals, particularly marine fishes.

== Early life and education ==
Grosell was born in Roskilde, Denmark, and grew up near Copenhagen. He developed an early interest in aquatic life and studied at the August Krogh Institute of the University of Copenhagen. He received a master's degree in 1993 and a PhD in 1997.

== Career ==
In 2002, Grosell joined the faculty of the Rosenstiel School of Marine and Atmospheric Science at the University of Miami. He was promoted to associate professor in 2007 and professor in 2010. He served as associate dean of graduate studies from 2010 to 2013 and as chair of the Department of Marine Biology and Ecology in 2014–2015 and again from 2019 onward.

Grosell was principal investigator and director of the Gulf of Mexico Research Initiative's RECOVER consortium, which studied the physiological effects of crude oil exposure on fish following the Deepwater Horizon oil spill. The consortium received $9 million in funding from GoMRI.

Grosell is also the Maytag Professor of Ichthyology at the University of Miami.

== Research ==
Grosell's research concerns the mechanisms by which marine fish maintain salt and water balance. His work has examined intestinal bicarbonate secretion and its role in osmoregulation and acid–base balance in marine teleosts.

This work is also connected to the production of calcium carbonate by marine fish. Fish can precipitate magnesium-rich calcium carbonate in their intestines as part of the process by which they regulate ions and water after drinking seawater. These fish-produced carbonates have been termed ichthyocarbonates.

In a 2009 study published in Science, Grosell and colleagues examined the contribution of fish to the marine inorganic carbon cycle. The study proposed that fish-produced carbonates represent a previously underappreciated component of marine carbonate production.

A 2025 study reported evidence that mesopelagic fishes produce intestinal carbonate and suggested that relationships between fish size, temperature, and carbonate excretion observed in shallow-water fishes may also apply to fish populations at depth.

Grosell and colleagues have examined the effects of Deepwater Horizon oil on mahi-mahi (Coryphaena hippurus). Research reported effects on physiological and behavioral responses following crude-oil exposure, including impaired fitness in wild fish.

A 2021 study used summarized accelerometry data from satellite-tagged fish to predict spawning behavior in the open ocean.

== Awards and honors ==
Grosell received the R. G. Boutilier New Investigator Award from the Canadian Society of Zoologists in 2005 for work on intestinal anion exchange and marine teleost osmoregulation.

In 2018, he received the Award of Excellence in Fish Physiology from the American Fisheries Society for his contributions to fish physiology.

In 2024, Grosell received the August Krogh Distinguished Lectureship of the Comparative and Evolutionary Physiology Section of the American Physiological Society. The award recognizes contributions to comparative and evolutionary physiology.

== Selected publications ==
- Wilson, R. W.; Millero, F. J.; Taylor, J. R.; Walsh, P. J.; Christensen, V.; Jennings, S.; Grosell, M. (2009). "Contribution of fish to the marine inorganic carbon cycle". Science. 323 (5912): 359–362. doi:10.1126/science.1157972.
- Grosell, M. (2011). "Intestinal anion exchange in marine teleosts is involved in osmoregulation and contributes to the oceanic inorganic carbon cycle". Acta Physiologica. 202 (3): 421–434. doi:10.1111/j.1748-1716.2010.02183.x.
- Heuer, R. M.; Grosell, M. (2014). "Physiological impacts of elevated carbon dioxide and ocean acidification on fish". American Journal of Physiology-Regulatory, Integrative and Comparative Physiology. 307 (9): R1061–R1084.
- Incardona, J. P.; Gardner, L. D.; Linbo, T. L.; Brown, T. L.; Esbaugh, A. J.; Mager, E. M.; Stieglitz, J. D.; French, B. L.; Labenia, J. S.; Laetz, C. A.; Tagal, M.; Sloan, C. A.; Elizur, A.; Benetti, D. D.; Grosell, M.; Block, B. A.; Scholz, N. L. (2014). "Deepwater Horizon crude oil is cardiotoxic to the developing hearts of pelagic fish". Proceedings of the National Academy of Sciences. 111 (15): E1510–E1518.
- Grosell, M.; Pasparakis, C. (2021). "Physiological Responses of Fish to Oil Spills". Annual Review of Marine Science. 13: 137–160.
- Oehlert, A. M.; Garza, J.; Nixon, S.; Frank, L.; Heuer, R. M.; del Campo, J.; Gomez, F.; rosell, M. (2024). "Implications of dietary carbon incorporation in fish carbonates for the global carbon cycle". Science of the Total Environment. 916: 169895.
