= Skin cancer in cats and dogs =

Many types of skin tumors, both benign (noncancerous) and malignant (cancerous), exist in cats and dogs. Approximately 20–40% of primary skin tumors are malignant in dogs and 50–65% are malignant in cats. Not all forms of skin cancer in cats and dogs are caused by sun exposure, but it can happen occasionally. On dogs, the nose and pads of the feet contain sensitive skin and no fur to protect from the sun. Also, cats and dogs with thin or light-colored coats are at a higher risk of sun damage over their entire bodies.

== Diagnosis ==
Typically, either cytologic or histopathologic analysis of the suspected mass is done prior to initiating treatment. The commonly used diagnostic procedures for skin tumors are fine-needle aspiration cytology and tissue biopsy.

Cytology is an important tool that can help the veterinarian distinguish a tumor from inflammatory lesions. The biopsy technique used will largely depend on the tumor's size and location. Small masses are usually completely excised and sent to the pathology lab to confirm that the surrounding healthy tissues that were excised along with the tumor do not contain any cancer cells. If the tumor is larger, a small sample is removed for analysis and depending on the results, appropriate treatment is chosen. Depending on the tumor type and its level of aggressiveness, additional diagnostic tests can include blood tests to assess the pet's overall health, chest X-rays to check for lung metastasis, and abdominal ultrasound to check for metastasis to other internal organs.

== Prognosis ==
=== Melanoma ===
The breed of the animal can be prognostic: 85% of melanomas in miniature Poodles are behaviourally malignant whilst 75% of melanomas in Dobermanns and schnauzers are benign. Location of the melanoma may also be prognostic with most oral, scrotal, and non-eyelid mucocutaneous melanomas being malignant. 35-50% of feline melanomas are reported as malignant.

=== Basal cell tumours ===
Prognosis is usually good; malignant tumours are slow growing and of low malignancy and metastisation is rare.

=== Hair follicle tumours ===
Prognosis is good and excision via surgery or laser is curative. The tumours aren't locally invasive and don't metastasize; however there is a report of a pilomatrixoma that caused neurological complications and was metastatic.

== Treatment ==
The specific treatment will depend on the tumor's type, location, size, and whether the cancer has spread to other organs. Surgical removal of the tumor remains the standard treatment of choice, but additional forms of therapy such as radiation therapy, chemotherapy, or immunotherapy exist.

When detected early, skin cancer in cats and dogs can often be treated successfully. In many cases, a biopsy can remove the whole tumor, as long as the healthy tissues removed from just outside the tumor area do not contain any cancer cells.
