= FCK =

FCK may refer to:

- A short form for fuck, an English-language profanity
- F.C. Copenhagen (Danish: F.C. København), a Danish football club
- 1. FC Kaiserslautern, a German football club
- FC Koper, a Slovenian football club
- Furnace Creek Airport, near Death Valley, California, United States
- FCK (print ad), an award-winning ad for KFC UK
- Flat-chested kitten syndrome, a feline disorder
