= Bulldog =

British breed of dog

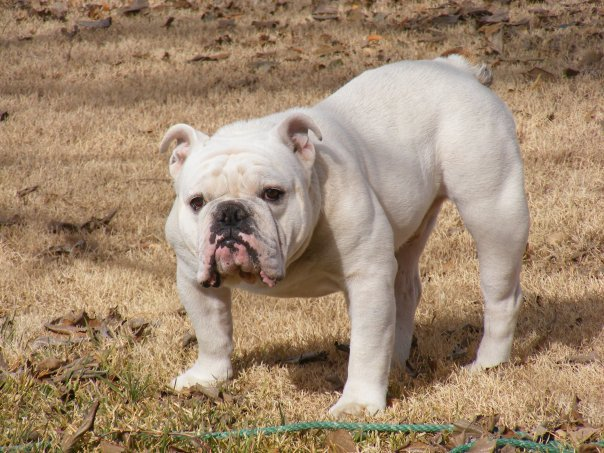
- Other names: English Bulldog; British Bulldog
- Origin: England
Traits
Weight	Males	25 kg (55 lb)
	Females	23 kg (51 lb)
- Colour: brindle; solid white, red, fawn or yellow; piebald
Kennel club standards
- The Kennel Club: standard
- Fédération Cynologique Internationale: standard

The Bulldog is a British breed of dog of mastiff type. It may also be known as the English Bulldog or British Bulldog. It is a stocky, muscular dog of medium size, with a large head, thick folds of skin around the face and shoulders and a relatively flat face with a protruding lower jaw. Selective breeding for appearance has led to the Bulldog's increased susceptibility to various health problems including brachycephaly, hip dysplasia and heat sensitivity. The dogs are illegal to breed in the Netherlands because of concerns about their quality of life.

The modern Bulldog was bred as a companion dog from the Old English Bulldog, a now-extinct breed used for bull-baiting until the sport was outlawed under the Cruelty to Animals Act of 1835. The Bulldog Club (in England) was formed in 1878, and the Bulldog Club of America was formed in 1890. While often used as a symbol of ferocity and courage, the modern Bulldog is generally a friendly, amiable dog. It is commonly kept as a pet; in 2013 it was the twelfth-most-frequently registered breed worldwide.

== History ==
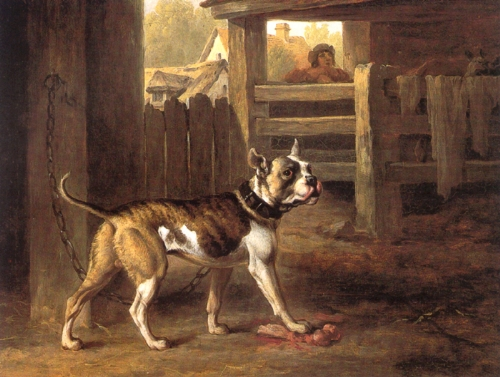
Painting of a Bulldog from 1790 by English artist Philip Reinagle

The first reference to the word "Bulldog" is dated 1631 or 1632 in a letter by a man named Preswick Eaton where he writes: "procuer mee two good Bulldogs, and let them be sent by ye first shipp". In 1666, English scientist Christopher Merret applied: "Canis pugnax, a Butchers Bull or Bear Dog", as an entry in his Pinax Rerum Naturalium Britannicarum.

The designation "bull" was applied because of the dog's use in the sport of bull-baiting. This entailed the setting of dogs (after placing wagers on each dog) onto a tethered bull. The dog that grabbed the bull by the nose and pinned it to the ground would be the victor. It was common for a bull to maim or kill several dogs at such an event, either by goring, tossing, or trampling over them. Over the centuries, dogs used for bull-baiting developed the stocky bodies and massive heads and jaws that typify the breed, as well as a ferocious and savage temperament. Bull-baiting was made illegal in England by the Cruelty to Animals Act 1835. Therefore, the Old English Bulldog had outlived its usefulness in England as a sporting animal and its "working" days were numbered. However, emigrants did have a use for such dogs in the New World. In mid-17th century New York, Bulldogs were used as a part of a citywide roundup effort led by Governor Richard Nicolls. Because cornering and leading wild bulls was dangerous, Bulldogs were trained to seize a bull by its nose long enough for a rope to be secured around its neck.

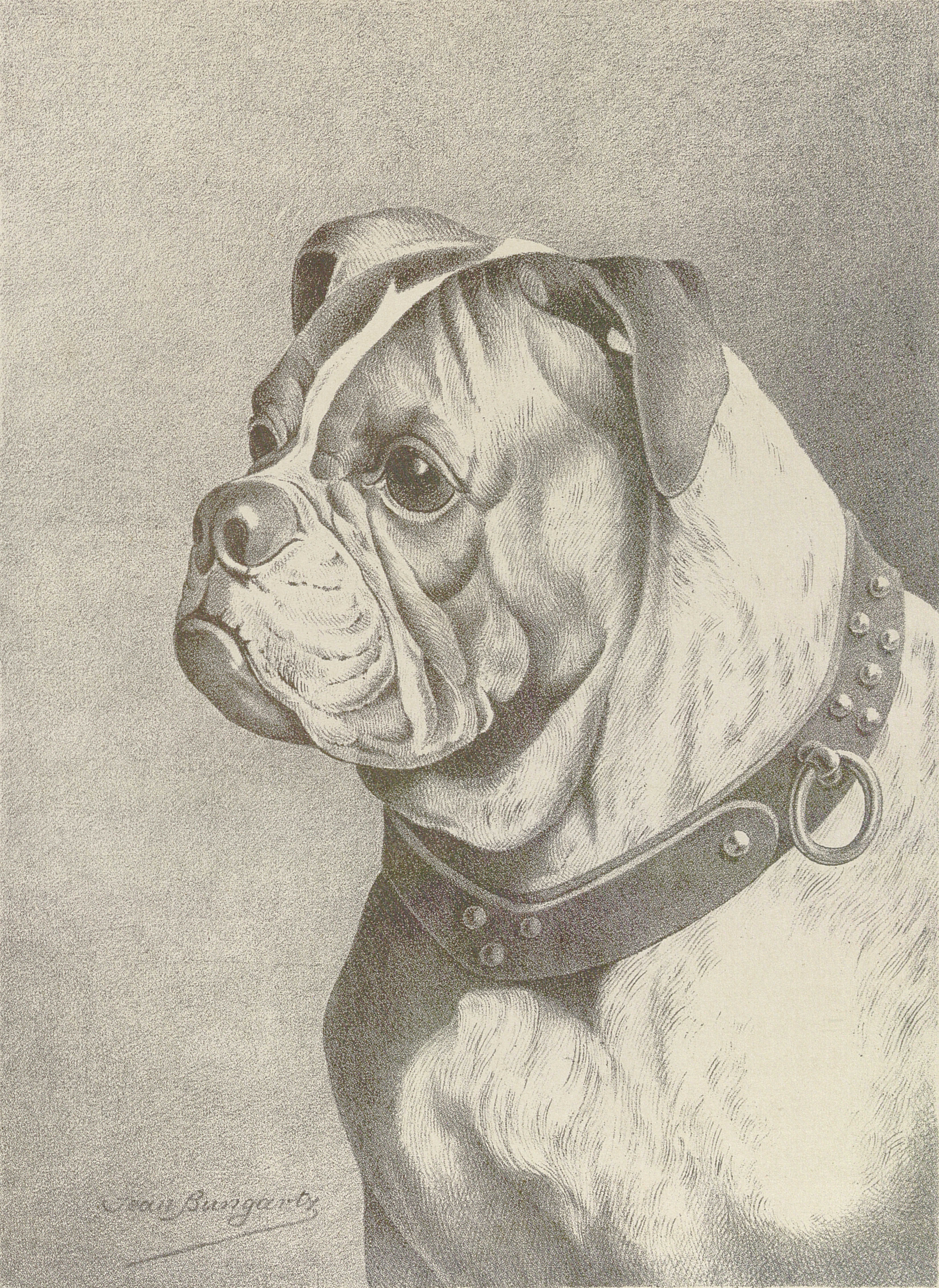
Bulldog on an 1890 illustration

Bulldogs as pets were continually promoted by dog dealer Bill George.

In 1864, a group of Bulldog breeders under R. S. Rockstro founded the first Bulldog Club. Three years after its opening the Club ceased to exist, not having organised a single show. The main achievement of the Rockstro Bulldog Club was a detailed description of the Bulldog, known as the Philo-Kuan Standard. Samuel Wickens, treasurer of the club, published this description in 1865 under the pseudonym Philo-Kuan.

On 4 April 1873, The Kennel Club was founded, the first dog breeding club dealing with the registration of purebred dogs and dog breeds. Bulldogs were included in the first volume of the Kennel Club Stud Book, which was presented at the Birmingham Show on 1 December 1874. The first English Bulldog entered into the register was a male dog named Adam, born in 1864.

In March 1875, the third Bulldog Club was founded, which still exists today. Members of this club met frequently at the Blue Post pub on Oxford Street in London. The founders of the club collected all available information about the breed and its best representatives and developed a new standard for the English Bulldog, which was published on 27 May 1875, the same year they held the first breed show. Since 1878, exhibitions of the club were held annually, except during the Second World War. On 17 May 1894, the Bulldog Club was granted the status of a corporation and since then has carried the official name "The Bulldog Club, Inc.". It is the oldest mono-breed dog kennel club in the world.

The Bulldog was officially recognised by the American Kennel Club in 1886.

In 1894, the two top Bulldogs, King Orry and Dock Leaf, competed in a contest to see which dog could walk 20 miles (32 km). King Orry was reminiscent of the original Bulldogs, lighter-boned and very athletic. Dock Leaf was a smaller and heavier set, more like modern Bulldogs. King Orry was declared the winner that year, finishing the 20-mile (32 km) walk while Dock Leaf collapsed and expired. Though today Bulldogs look tough, they cannot perform the job they were originally bred for, as they cannot withstand the rigours of running after and being thrown by a bull, and also cannot grip with such a short muzzle.

== Description ==
=== Appearance ===
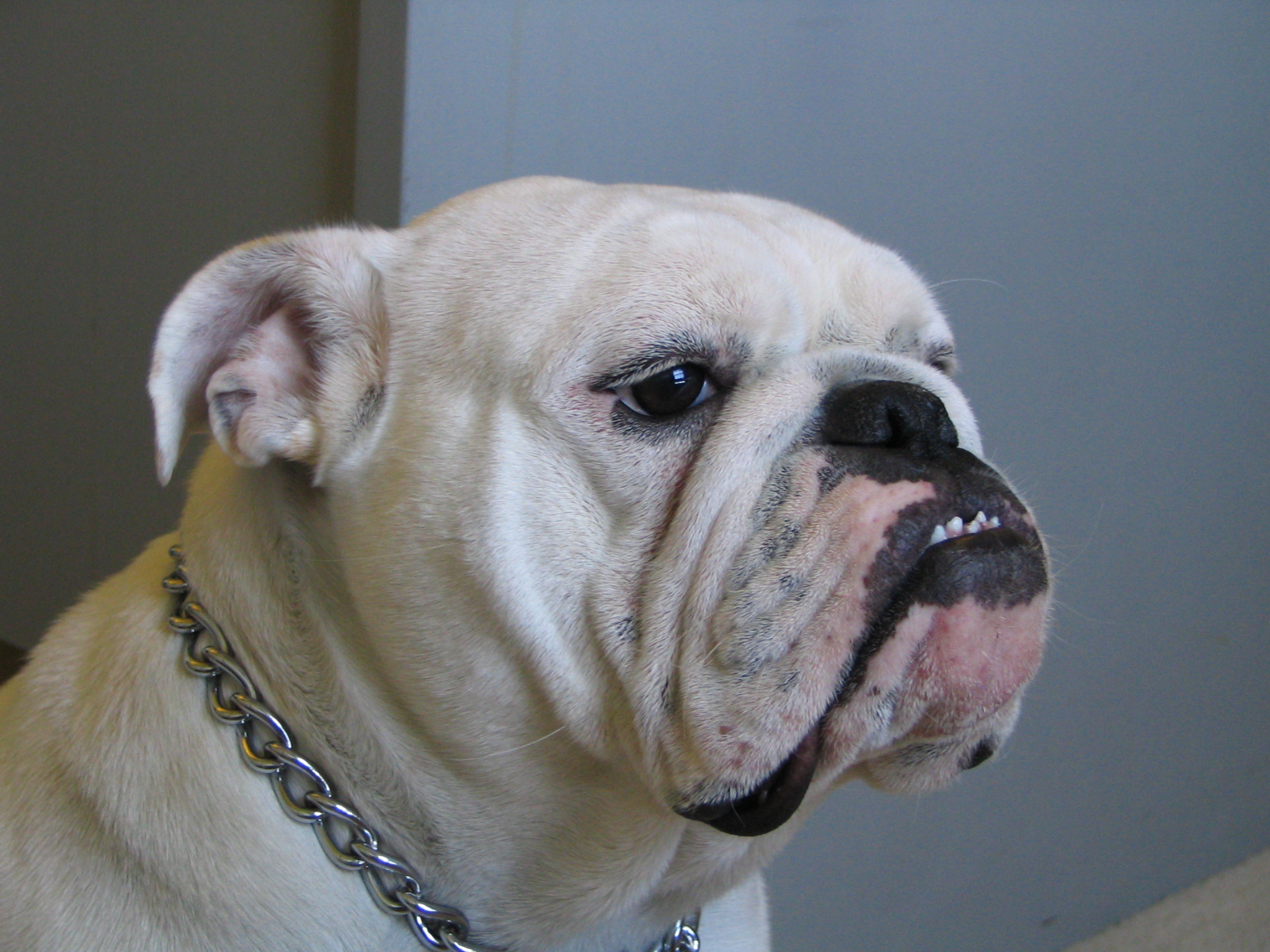
A 4-year-old Bulldog of Champion bloodlines, side view. Note the "rope" over the nose, and pronounced underbite.

Bulldogs have characteristically wide heads and shoulders along with a pronounced mandibular prognathism. There are generally thick folds of skin on the brow; round, black, wide-set eyes; a short muzzle with characteristic folds called a rope or nose roll above the nose; hanging skin under the neck; drooping lips and pointed teeth, and an underbite with an upturned jaw. The coat is short, flat, and sleek with colours of red, fawn, white, brindle, and piebald. Bulldogs have short tails that can either hang down straight or be tucked in a coiled "corkscrew" into a tail pocket.

Dogs weigh approximately 25 kg (55 lb), bitches about 23 kg (50 lb). Standard weights in the United States are lower, approximately 50 lb (23 kg) for dogs and 40 lb (18 kg) for bitches.

=== Temperament ===
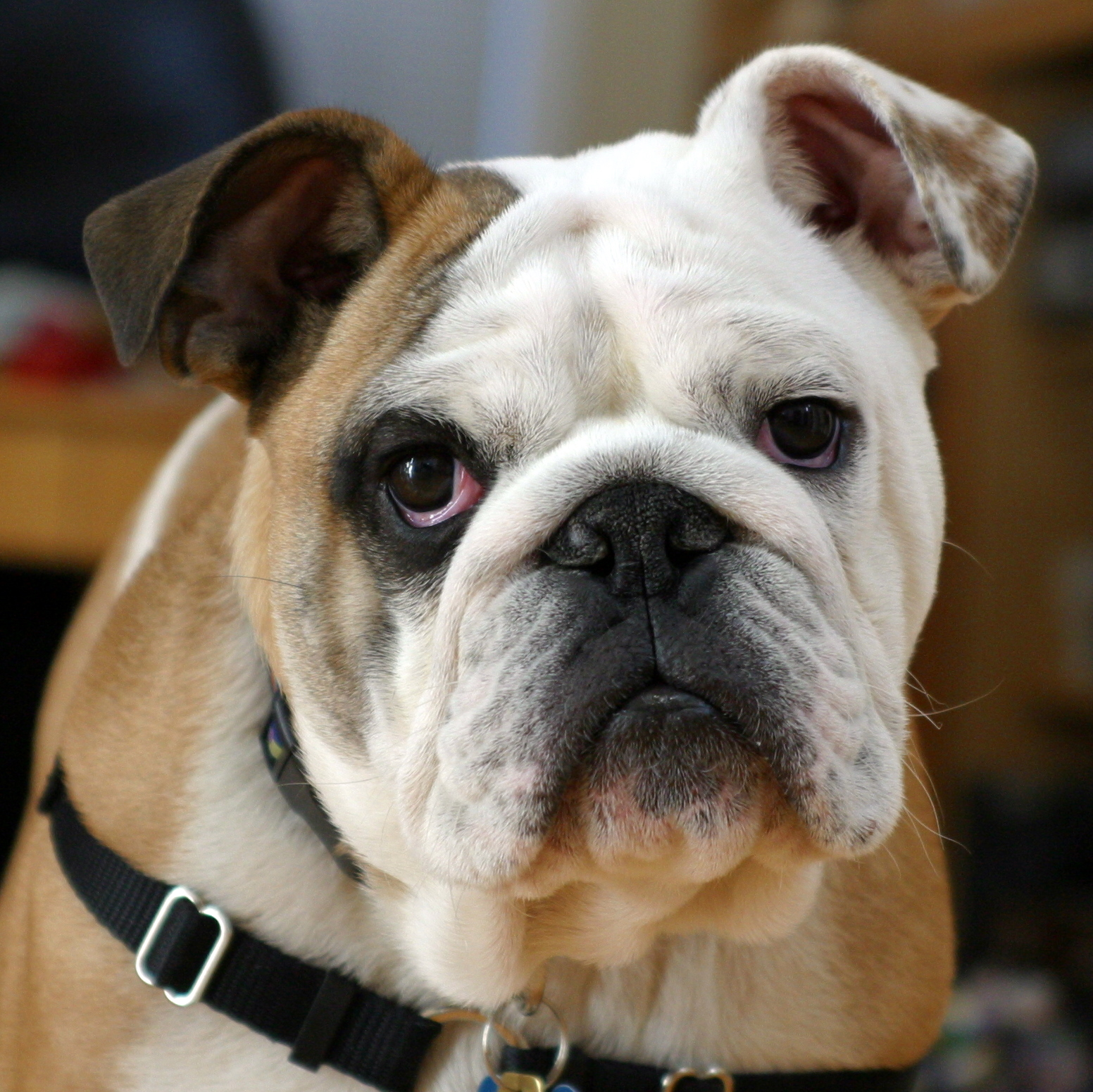
Six-month-old Bulldog puppy from AKC Champion bloodlines

According to the American Kennel Club, a Bulldog's disposition should be "equable and kind, resolute, and courageous (not vicious or aggressive), and demeanour should be pacifist and dignified. These attributes should be countenanced by the expression and behaviour".

Bulldogs are known for getting along well with children, other dogs, and other pets.

== Health ==
=== Lifespan ===
A 2022 study in the UK of veterinary data found a life expectancy of 7.39 years, the second lowest of all breeds in the study. A 2024 UK study found a life expectancy of 9.8 years for the breed compared to an average of 12.7 for purebreeds and 12 for crossbreeds.

A 2004 UK survey found the leading cause of death of Bulldogs to be cardiac-related (20%), cancer (18%), and old age (9%).

=== Brachycephaly ===
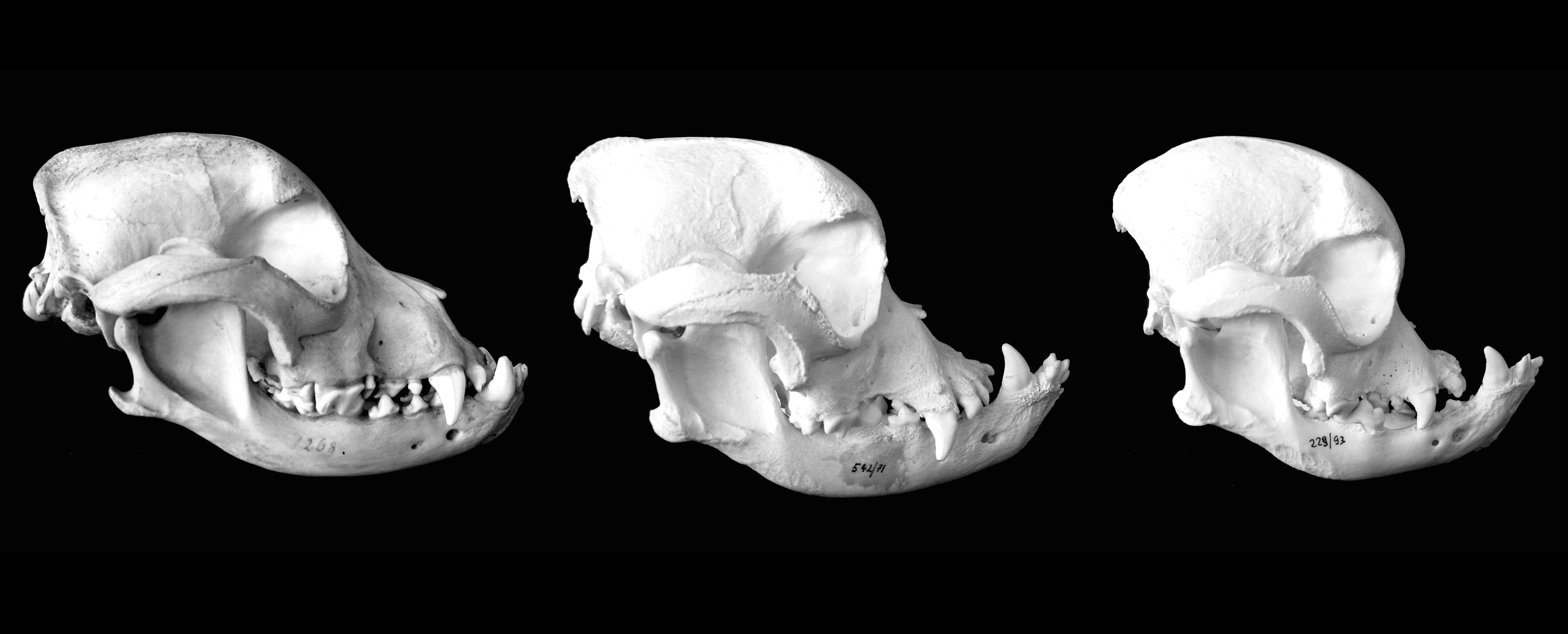
Evolution of brachycephalia in Bulldogs. Left to right, the skulls are from approximately the 1910s, 1960s, and 1980s.

The shortened snout and pushed in face of the Bulldog is known as brachycephaly. Brachycephaly results in deformation of the upper airway tract and leads to obstruction of breathing. Effects of brachycephaly are stridor, stertorous breathing, emesis, skin fold dermatitis, brachycephalic airway obstructive syndrome, exophthalmos, pharyngeal gag reflex, cyanosis, and laryngeal collapse. Other issues arising from brachycephaly are risk of complications while under anaesthesia, and hyperthermia — with the latter caused due to an inability to effectively reduce body temperature via panting. Many airlines ban the breed from flying in the cargo hold due to a high rate of deaths from air pressure interacting poorly with their breathing problems.

=== Other conditions ===
A study by the Royal Veterinary College found that Bulldogs are a much less healthy breed than average, with over twice the odds of being diagnosed with at least one of the common dog disorders investigated in the study.

Statistics from the Orthopedic Foundation for Animals indicate that of the 467 Bulldogs tested between 1979 and 2009 (30 years), 73.9% were affected by hip dysplasia, the highest among all breeds. Similarly, the breed has the worst score in the British Veterinary Association/Kennel Club Hip Dysplasia scoring scheme, although only 22 Bulldogs were tested in the scheme. A study in England found the Bulldog to have a nearly three times greater risk of patellar luxation, with 2.9% of all Bulldogs having the condition. It is the dog breed that has been found to most often suffer from swimmer puppy syndrome, where the back legs are spread-eagled.

In a 1963 UK study, 17% of Bulldogs surveyed had skin fold dermatitis. The breed is also predisposed to atopic dermatitis. A British study found demodicosis to be more prevalent in the Bulldog than other breeds. The overall prevalence was 1.5% in the breed compared to the 0.17% rate for all dogs. For dogs aged under 2 years, the prevalence was 3.6% compared to 0.48%.

Over 80% of Bulldog litters are delivered by Caesarean section because their characteristically large heads can become lodged in the mother's birth canal and to avoid potential breathing problems for the mother during labour.

The Bulldog is one of the two most commonly affected breeds for hiatal hernia.

=== Controversies and legal status ===
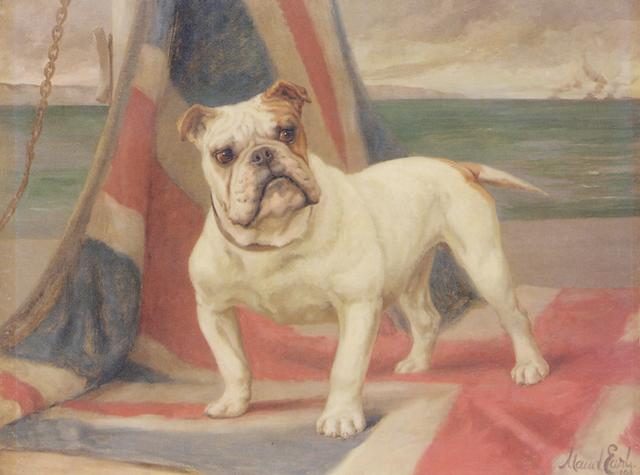
Bulldogs are a national symbol of British culture; this is a bulldog on a British flag.

In January 2009, after the BBC documentary Pedigree Dogs Exposed, The Kennel Club introduced revised breed standards for the British Bulldog, along with 209 other breeds, to address health concerns. Opposed by the British Bulldog Breed Council, it was speculated by the press that the changes would lead to a smaller head, fewer skin folds, a longer muzzle, and a taller thinner posture, to combat problems with respiration and breeding due to head size and width of shoulders. In 2019 the Dutch Kennel Club implemented some breeding rules to improve the health of the Bulldog. Among these is a fitness test where the dog has to walk 1 km (0.62 miles) in 12 minutes. Its temperature and heart rate have to recover after 15 minutes.

In 2014, the Dutch government forbade the breeding of dogs with a snout shorter than a third of the skull, including Bulldogs, a law that it began enforcing in 2019. In 2022, the Oslo District Court made a ruling that banned the breeding of Bulldogs in Norway due to their propensity for developing health problems. In its verdict the court judged that no dog of this breed could be considered healthy, therefore using them for breeding would be a violation of Norway's Animal Welfare Act. The ban on breeding Bulldogs was overturned by Norway's Borgarting Court of Appeal, which ruled that it was legal to breed English bulldogs in Norway.

== Cultural significance ==
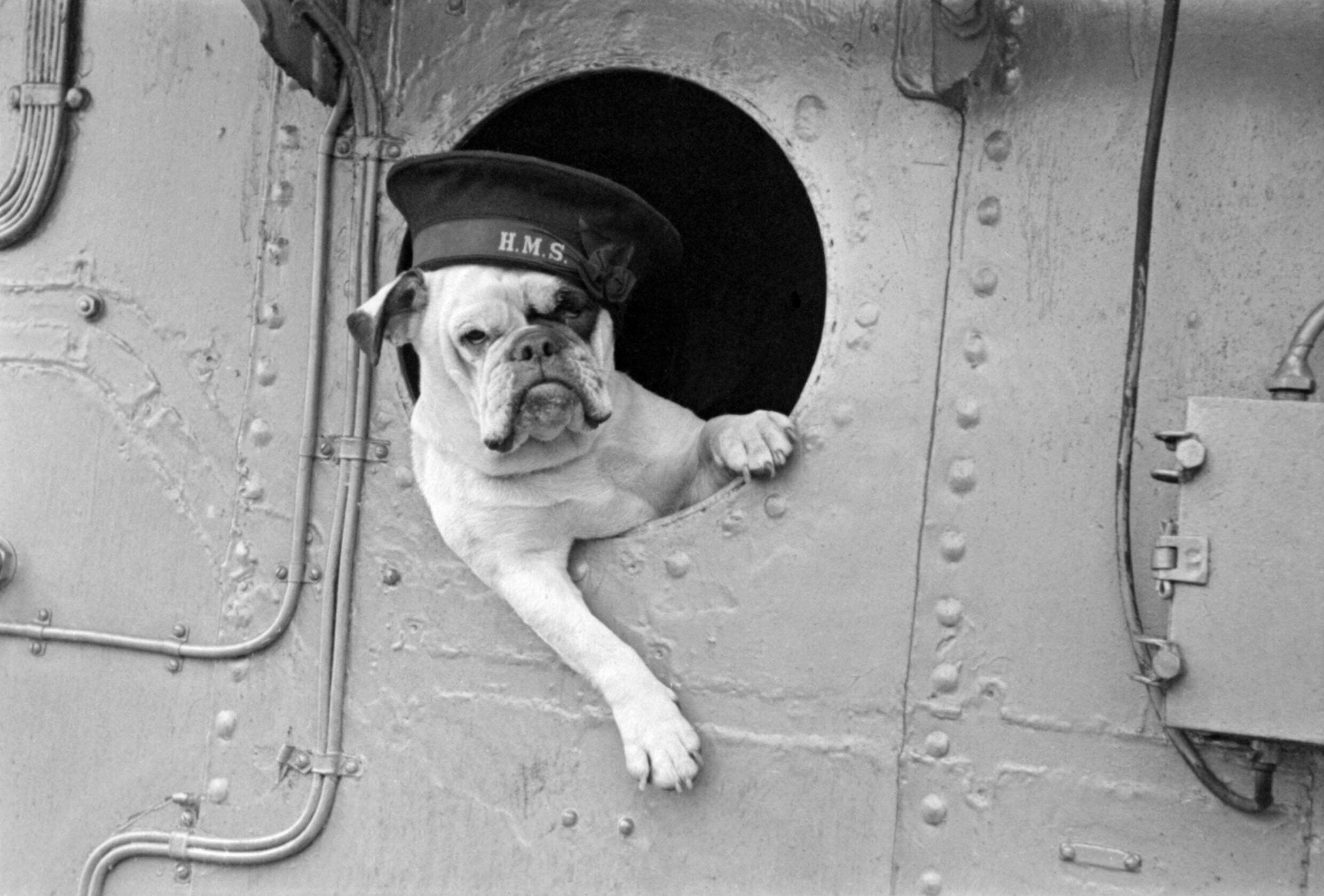
Venus, the ship's mascot, aboard HMS Vansittart, 1941

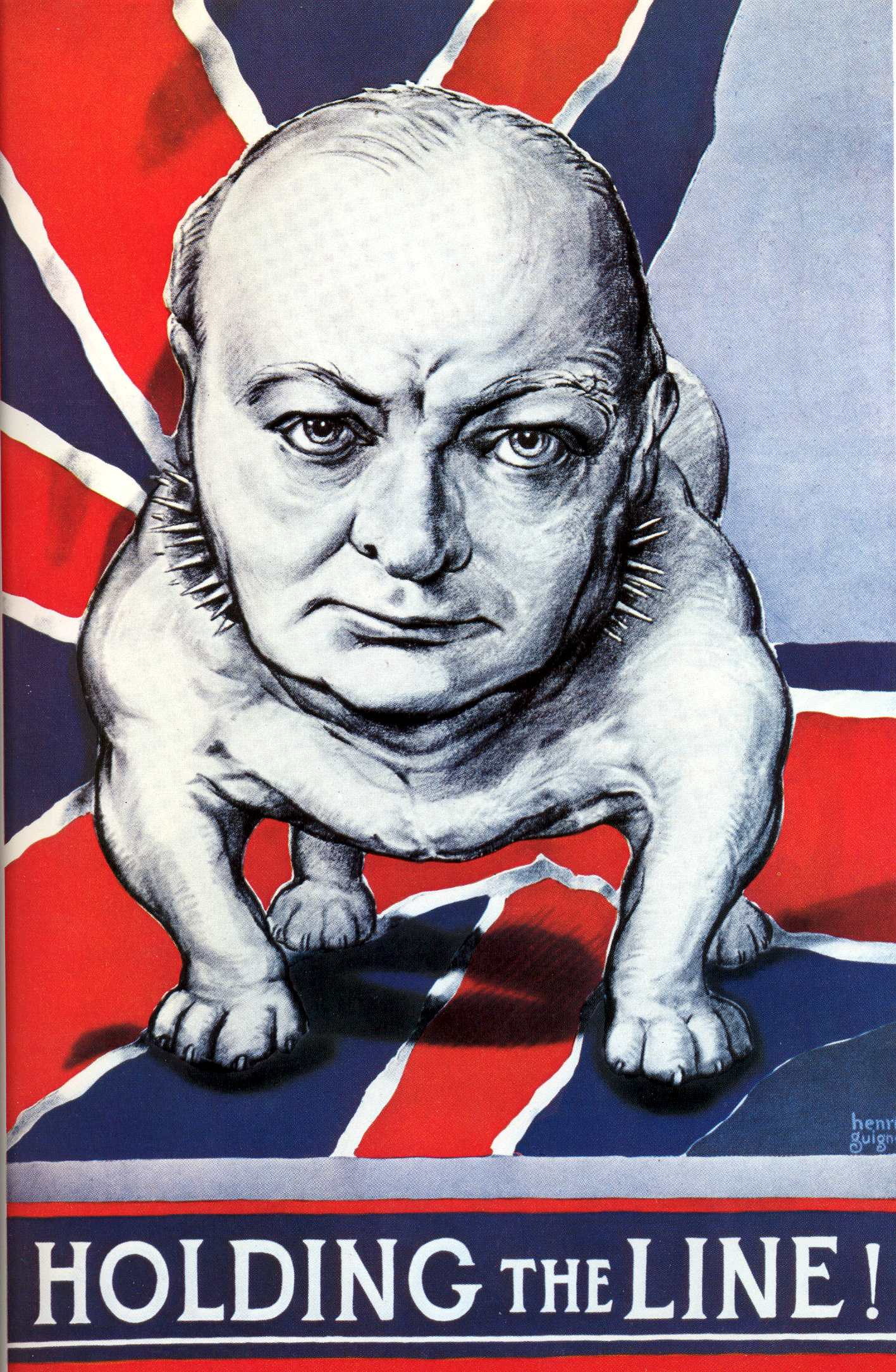
World War II propaganda poster depicting Winston Churchill as a "British Bulldog"

Bulldogs are often associated with determination, strength, and courage due to their historical occupation, though the modern-day dog is bred for appearance and friendliness and not suited for significant physical exertion. They are often used as mascots by universities, sports teams, and other organisations. Some of the better-known Bulldog mascots include the University of Georgia's Uga, Mississippi State's Bully, Georgetown's Jack, Butler's Blue IV, Yale's Handsome Dan, and the United States Marine Corps' Chesty.

The Bulldog originated in England and has a longstanding association with British culture; the BBC wrote: "To many the Bulldog is a national icon, symbolising pluck and determination". During the Second World War, the Prime Minister Winston Churchill was likened to a Bulldog for his defiance of Nazi Germany.
