= Swimmer puppy syndrome =

Canine medical condition

Swimmer puppy syndrome is a rare condition in which dogs are born flat on their chests and abdomens, leaving them with spread-eagled legs. This deformity leaves the canine unable to stand or walk. The British Bulldog is the dog breed that it found to suffer from the condition the most.

== Treatments ==
If early intervention such as physiotherapy is given, the legs of the dog should straighten out.
