= Acral myxoinflammatory fibroblastic sarcoma =

Soft tissue tumor

Acral myxoinflammatory fibroblastic sarcoma (AMSF), also termed myxoinflammatory fibroblastic sarcoma (MSF), is a rare, low-grade, soft tissue tumor that the World Health Organization (2020) classified as in the category of rarely metastasizing fibroblastic and myofibroblastic tumors. It is a locally aggressive neoplasm that often recurs at the site of its surgical removal. However, it usually grows slowly and in only 1–2% of cases spreads to distant tissues.

AMSF tumors commonly develop in the subcutaneous tissues of the arms or legs of adults with an equal incidence (~1 per million individuals) in males and females. These tumors are composed of a prominent inflammatory cell infiltrate admixed with cells that have highly variable microscopic appearances, including, in particular, distinctively large, neoplastic epithelioid cells, i.e. cells resembling epithelial cells, and lipoblast-like fibroblastic cells containing multiple vacuoles. The variable microscopic appearances of AMSF tumors have made them difficult to correctly diagnose in many cases.

AMSF lesions are treated by surgical resection with the goal to remove all tumor tissue in order to reduce local recurrences. Repeated local recurrences are treated by repeated surgical resections. In extreme cases, a combination of radiation therapy with surgical resection or amputation of an involved appendage has been used to treat these tumors. Chemotherapy of localized, recurrent, and/or metastatic disease has not yet been shown to be a useful treatment strategy for AMSF.

== Presentation ==
AMSF tumors typically occur in adults (average age: 40 years), but have been reported in individuals aged 4 to 91 years. Individuals commonly present with a subcutaneous or less commonly intramuscular tumor located in an acral (i.e. distal), dorsal (i.e. posterior side) of a limb: about two-thirds of cases occur in a finger, hand, wrist, foot, or ankle. In a minority of cases, these tumors have developed in the upper arm, thigh, shoulder, inguinal area (i.e. groin or lower, lateral abdomen), upper back, neck, temple area of the head, and in one case, the nose. Individuals commonly present with a painless, slowly growing mass in one of these areas. The size of these tumors has ranged from 1.5 to 18 cm, although one AMSF tumor that spanned the supraclavicular and infraclavicular fossa areas had a maximum diameter of 25 cm and another AMSF tumor in the thigh had a maximum diameter of 30 cm. Individuals often re-present with a recurrence of their tumor at the site of its previous surgical removal or, in rare cases, present with metastatic disease.

== Pathology ==
As examined by gross pathology, AMSF tumors are typically lobulated, with gelatinous, fleshy, or firm areas that vary in color and texture; they are most often localized to subcutaneous adipose tissue but may infiltrate into nearby tissues. Histopathologic microscopic examinations of hematoxylin and eosin stained tumors characteristically show spindle-shaped cells admixed with prominent inflammation-like areas containing a mixture of neutrophils, lymphocytes, and plasma cells. The areas of these lesions that contain spindle cells are often also occupied by distinctively large, variably-shaped epithelioid cells that have vesicle-laden nuclei and acidophilic (readily stained with acid dyes) nucleoli. These cells have been termed Reed-Sternberg cell-like, virocyte-like (i.e. cells which, similar to some viruses, have sticklike protrusions), and ganglion cell-like. The tumors may also contain large vacuolated pseudolipoblasts (i.e. cells that resemble lipoblasts). These various cell types are embedded in a myxoid (i.e. more blue or purple compared to normal connective tissue because of excessive uptake of the hematoxylin stain) and collagen fiber-laden tissue background. In addition to the cited cell types, the tumors may contain degenerated, dying, and or dead cells and large histiocyte-like cells that have engulfed other cells, usually neutrophils (this cell-engulfing phenomenon is termed emperipolesis). In one large study, emperipolesis of white blood cells appeared to be a helpful indicator of AMSF.) The proportions, numbers, and types of these cells varies greatly among cases and thereby may present diagnostic challenges. For example, AMSF tumors can have dense inflammatory infiltrates which obscure other cell types and thereby suggest that the lesion is a purely inflammatory reaction.

A recent immunohistochemical immunostaining small study on AMSF tumor tissue detected cells that expressed the vimentin protein in almost all cases; expressed MUC1 (also termed EMA), CD31, CD34, CD68, and PDPN proteins in a variable number of cases; and did not express CD45, CD15, CD30, HMB-45, MLANA (also termed Melan-A), desmin, GFAP, or S100 proteins. Earlier studies had reported that these cells express vimentin, periodic acid-Schiff, CD34, CD68, and S100 proteins in many cases but not MUC1, cytokeratin, or desmin proteins. The expression profiles of these proteins, which sometimes differed in different studies, have not been helpful in identifying a tumor as an AMSF.

== Gene and chromosome abnormalities ==
Several abnormalities in the chromosomes and genes have been variably reported in the neoplastic cells of a minority of AMSF cases. These abnormalities include: 1) loses in chromosome 3 or chromosome 13; 2) a translocation between the TGFBR3 gene located in band 22.1 on the short (or "p") arm of chromosome 1 and the MGEA5 gene located in band 24 of the long (or "q") arm of chromosome 10; 3) the presence of a ring chromosome that is associated with the overexpression of the VGLL3 protein (VGLL3 is also overexpressed in various high-grade sarcomas) as well as the overexpression of the CHMP2B protein; and 4) incompletely defined fusions of the BRAF gene located in band 34 on the q arm of chromosome 7 with other genes. These molecular findings have not as yet been shown to be involved in the development of, or helpful in diagnosing, AMSF.

== Diagnosis ==
Since the immunostaining, abnormal gene, and abnormal chromosome profiles of AMSF tissues are non-specific, the diagnosis of these tumors rests mostly on patient presentation and tumor histopathologic grounds. AMSF may be confused with other myxoid-rich soft tissue tumors such as myxoid liposarcoma (MyxLPS), myxofibrosarcoma (MyxoFS), and extra-skeletal myxoid chondrosarcoma (EMC). MyxoFS tumors more often occur in a proximal rather than acral location, consist of more prominent capillary vessels, and lack inflammatory and VRS-like cells. MyxLpS tumors consist of a monotonous cell population arranged in discrete myxoid-cellular clusters with conspicuous thin branching capillaries in a "chicken-wire pattern". EMC rumors: contain an epithelioid/rounded cell population arranged in single cells, clusters, or linear cords; lack VRS-like cells; and have neoplastic cells that express diagnostic fusion genes involving the NR4A3 gene fused with either the EWSR1 or TAF15 gene. Some nodular fasciitis and proliferative fasciitis lesions may have myxoid areas but unlike AMSF tumors are rapidly growing, contain ganglion-like cells with only rare inflammatory cells, and may regress without treatment. Other lesions that frequently present in acral areas of the extremities such as hemosiderotic fibrolipomatous tumor, epithelioid sarcoma, synovial sarcoma, acral fibromyxoma, giant cell tumor of tendon sheath, and clear cell sarcoma are usually distinguished from AMSF based on their clinical presentations, gross pathologies, histopathologies, and/or neoplastic cell expressions of marker proteins, abnormal chromosomes, and/or abnormal genes.

== Treatment ==
Whenever possible, the first-choice treatment of AMSF tumors is surgical resection with wide margins in order to remove all neoplastic tissue. This treatment can be curative particularly when all tumor is removed but recurrences have developed at the sites of their surgical removals in 22% to 67% of all cases. Repeated recurrences at a site are commonly treated with repeated surgical resections with some patients treated with several resections at a site. Amputations of an extremity may be considered when wide resection fails to preserve a functional lower extremity or when multiple resections are consistently followed by recurrences. Preoperative or postoperative radiation therapy may have a role in treating these tumors, especially in cases were surgical removal leaves tumor tissue behind. In a minority of cases (i.e. 1–2%), AMSF tumors metastasize to distant tissues. Radiation and chemotherapy either alone or in combination have been used to treat metastatic disease. While radiation therapy has been associated with improved local control, its overall efficacy has not been fully studied and remains unclear. The role of chemotherapy in the treatment of local and metastatic disease is also unclear.

== History ==
This lesion was first described in 1998 independently in three publications which named the disorder "acral myxoinflammatory fibroblastic sarcoma", "inflammatory myxoid tumor of the soft parts with bizarre giant cells", and "inflammatory myxohyaline tumor of distal extremities with virocyte or Reed-Sternberg-like cells".
