= Diffuse large B-cell lymphoma associated with chronic inflammation =

- Other names: Epstein–Barr virus-associated diffuse large B cell lymphoma associated with chronic inflammation; pyothorax-associated lymphoma
- Specialty: Hematology, oncology
- Symptoms: Pain at tumor sites
- Complications: Spread to other tissues
- Diagnostic method: Histology of biopsied tissue
- Prognosis: Guarded
- Frequency: Rare

Diffuse large B-cell lymphoma associated with chronic inflammation (DLBCL-CI) is a subtype of the Diffuse large B-cell lymphomas and a rare form of the Epstein–Barr virus-associated lymphoproliferative diseases, i.e. conditions in which lymphocytes infected with the Epstein-Barr virus (EBV) proliferate excessively in one or more tissues. EBV infects ~95% of the world's population to cause no symptoms, minor non-specific symptoms, or infectious mononucleosis. The virus then enters a latency phase in which the infected individual becomes a lifetime asymptomatic carrier of the virus. Some weeks, months, years, or decades thereafter, a very small fraction of these carriers, particularly those with an immunodeficiency, develop any one of various EBV-associated benign or malignant diseases.

The EBV-associated diseases include: 1) some cases of non-lymphoproliferative disorders such as the Alice in Wonderland syndrome, cerebellar ataxia, particularly childhood cases of this disorder, and two autoimmune diseases, multiple sclerosis and systemic lupus erythematosis; 2) non-lymphoid cancers such as EBV+ gastric cancer, most if not all cases of nasopharyngeal cancer, and some cases of soft tissue sarcoma and leiomyosarcoma; and 3) Epstein-Barr virus-associated lymphoproliferative diseases such as chronic active EBV infection, EBV+ hemophagocytic lymphohistiocytosis, EBV+ Burkitt lymphoma, EBV+ Hodgkin lymphoma, and the EBV+ diffuse large B-cell lymphomas which include as a subtype, DLBCL-CI.

DLBCL-CI is a highly aggressive malignancy that most commonly afflicts elderly males. In this disease, EBV-infected B-cell lymphocytes located in sites of chronic inflammation that are walled off from the immune system proliferate excessively, acquire pro-malignant gene changes, and eventually form a tumor mass. The historically most common form of DLBCL-CI, often termed pyothorax-associated lymphoma (PAL), exemplifies this disease. PAL develops in grossly inflamed pleural cavities may years after a pneumothorax is medically induced to collapse a lobe or entire lung in order to treat pleurisy caused by an otherwise uncontrollable inflammatory condition, usually (i.e. ~80% of all PAT cases) pulmonary tuberculosis. The pleural cavity and the inflammatory pus within it are thought to protect the EBV-infected B-cells from immune attack. Given the decline in the occurrence of chronic pleural tuberculosis and the virtual abandonment of therapeutic pneumothorax to treat chronic pleural inflammation, PAT is rarely encountered today. Currently, DLBCL-CI is diagnosed in other sites of chronic inflammation that are or appear to be sequestered from the immune system such as infected joints and bones or areas in and around foreign bodies.

In 2017, the World Health Organization provisionally included Fibrin-associated diffuse large B cell lymphoma (FA-DLBCL) as a form of DLBCL-CI. Similar to DLBCL-CI, FA-DLBCL is a diffuse large B-cell lymphoma that arises in immunologically sequestered sites (e.g. body cavities, foreign bodies). Unlike DLBCL-CI, however, FA-DLBCL most commonly develops in sites where fibrin, a breakdown product of the blood clotting factor, fibrinogen, forms and deposits on the abnormal tissues in body cavities or around foreign bodies. FA-DLBCL also differs from DLBCLCI in that it usually presents as infiltrates rather than tumors and is a far less aggressive and in many cases a relatively benign disease. Here, it is considered in the differential diagnosis of DLBCL-CI and more fully described elsewhere (see fibrin-associated diffuse large B-cell lymphoma).

== Presentation ==
Individuals presenting with the PAL form of DLBCL-CI have typically been elderly males (male to female ratio 4:1 to 12:1) with a median age of 67 years (range 46–86 years). Most of these individuals have been Japanese with a long (median 37 years) history of pyothorax due to tuberculosis previously treated with a pneumothorax. However, uncommon cases of PAT have been reported in Western Countries, in non-Japanese individuals, in individuals who were not threatened with a pneumothorax, and/or in individuals who had other causes than tuberculosis for their pyothorax. Patients with PAL commonly present with back and/or chest pain, coughing, fever, shortness of breath, and radiological evidence of a pleural space tumor which may be very large. The tumor may extend into the chest wall, ribs, lung tissue, lymph nodes of the mediastinum, and diaphragm but usually has not disseminated beyond these areas, i.e. examinations of the peripheral blood, bone marrow, and distal lymph nodes typically do not show evidence of the disease. Individuals with non-PAL forms of DLBCL-CI present with tumorous growths in or around bone infections, skin ulcers, venous ulcers, metallic implants, artificial heart valves, intrauterine birth control devices, and implanted surgical mesh. The presentation of these cases is similar to that of PAL: afflicted individuals are most often middle-aged or elderly males who have a long-standing (almost always >10 years) history of inflammation, have recently developed pain and localized swelling, and on radiological examination have a discrete, sometimes large, tumor mass at the involved site.

== Pathogenesis ==
DLBCL-CI develops in closed spaces which are or may be sequestered from the immune system; these spaces allow the survival and growth of cancer cells because they are cut off from the circulation and have decreases in various components of the immune system such as cytotoxic T-cells. The neoplastic B-cells in these spaces carry the EBV virus in stage III latency (see EBV latency infections) and therefore express the following viral products: 1) Epstein–Barr virus nuclear antigen 2 (EBNA-2) (a protein which stimulates infected cells to make >300 gene products some of which, e.g. the protein product of the MYC proto-oncogene, Myc, promote these cell's proliferation, survival, and malignancy); 2) two Epstein–Barr virus-encoded small RNAs, EBER 1 and 2, which cause infected cells to produce interleukin 6 (a protein that stimulates these cells to proliferate) and interleukin 10 (a protein that helps these cells avoid attack by host cytotoxic T-cells and also blocks their apoptosis responses thereby prolonging their survival); and 3) LMP1, a protein that regulates the infected cells' maturation and promotes their expression of NF-κB and BCL2 (which are cell signaling proteins that block the infected cells apoptosis responses and stimulates their proliferation). The neoplastic cells in this disease also show mutations in their p53 tumor suppressor gene, deletion of the TNFAIP3 gene (whose product protein inhibits NF-κB activation), and abnormalities in the expression of other genes. DLBCL-CI therefore appears to be a lymphoma that is driven by EBV-induced changes in the expression of various genes that regulate the malignant behavior of the B-cells which it infects. The development and progression of this disease depends on its development in an environment that affords protection from the immune system. And, the neoplastic B-cells in this disease are activated B-cells (i.e. ABC). DLBCL subtypes caused by ABC are far more aggressive than those caused by other B-cell types, i.e. germinal center B-cells (GBC) or unclassifiable B-cells. The ABC basis of DLBCL-CI likely contributes to its aggressiveness.

== Diagnosis ==
The diagnosis of DLBCL-CI is heavily dependent on patient history, presence of a tumor with the appropriate histology, and evidence indicating EBV infection. The patient should have a history of long-term chronic inflammation in a site that is known or thought to be sequestered from the immune system such as the pleural space, skin ulcer, or foreign body. The lesions, which generally are tumorous rather than infiltrative, should consist of large cells that resemble centroblasts, immunoblasts, or, less commonly, anaplastic (i.e. poorly differentiated), cells that are arranged in a diffuse pattern. Most of these large cells should be B-cells as identified by their expression of B-cell marker proteins (e.g. CD20, CD79a, PAX5, and IRF4) by immunostaining methods. These cells often show mutations in the P53 gene, overexpression of the Myc protein, and deletion of the TNFAIP3 gene and in all cases must show evidence of EBV infection as determined most commonly be detecting the expression of this virus's microRNA product, EBER-1 by polymerase chain reaction analysis. Typically, the neoplastic cells are identified as ABC rather than GBC or unclassifiable cells by gene expression profiling. In addition to the neoplastic B-cells, these lesions often contain non-neoplastic white blood cells such as T-cell lymphocytes, plasmacytes, and/or plasmavyte-like cells. The tissue background in these lesions usually shows fibrous thickening.

=== Differential diagnosis ===
DLBCL-CI must be differentiated from Fibrin-associated diffuse large B cell lymphoma (FA-DLBCL) and Epstein–Barr virus-positive diffuse large B-cell lymphoma, not otherwise specified (EBV+ DLBCL, NOS).

- Similar to DLBCL-CI, FA-DLBCL is an activated B-cell- (i.e. ABC)-type B-cell lymphoma driven by EBV infection (latency stage III) that develops in spaces known or thought to be sequestered from the immune system. Unlike DLBCL-CI, FA-DLB usually is not associated with local symptoms (e.g. pain) or systemic symptoms (e.g. fever) and is often discovered as an incidental infiltrate rather than a mass that develops: in pseudocysts of the spleen, adrenal gland, or retroperitoneum; in hydroceles or cysts of the testes or other organs; in or around hematomas of the subdural space, testes, or foreign bodies; in thrombi (i.e. blood clots) of large arteries; in myxomas (i.e. connective tissue tumors) of the heart's left atrium; and around artificial heart valves; or breast implants. Histologically, these infiltrates, similar to DLBCL-CI, consist of large B cells. Unlike DLBCL-CI, these lesions develop in, on, or around long-standing hamartomas, pseudocysts, cardiac myxomas, prosthetic heart valves, thrombus-laden endovascular grafts, hematomas, hydroceles, and prosthetic implants of the hip. The infiltrations consist of sheets, ribbons, or clusters of proliferating large B cells within avascular tissue that are often coated with or contain abundant fibrin and a paucity or complete absence of other types of inflammatory cells. The infiltrates typically do not spread beyond their initial sites and there is no evidence of lymph node, spleen, or other tissue involvement: FA-DLBCL often appears to be a non-malignant proliferation of EBV+ large B cells that are unable to proliferate and survive long-term outside of the sequestered sites. While DLBCL-CI, particularly in its PAL form, is an aggressive lymphoma with a five-year overall survival rate of 20–35%, FA-DLBCL, usually has a highly favorable outcome except when it involves the heart (e.g. in myxomas or on prosthetic valves) or vasculature structures (e.g. on thrombus-laden vascular grafts), in which cases life-threatening cardiovascular complications, particularly strokes, may occur.
- EBV+ DLBCL, NOS is distinguished from DLBCL-CI in that it: 1) occurs predominantly in East Asia and Mexico and less commonly in Europe and the USA; 2) most often develops in individuals who are immune-deficient due to HIV/AIDS or immunosuppressing anti-rejection drug therapy following solid organ transplantation or in rare cases known as the Richter transformation, is a progression of established chronic lymphocytic leukemia; 3) most often occurs in the middle-aged and elderly but has also been described in younger individuals; 4) commonly presents with systemic symptoms such as fever, night sweats, weight loss; 5) involves the infiltration of EBV-infected B-cells (stage III or stage II latency) in the upper gastrointestinal tract, lungs, upper airways, and/or other organs and 6) consists of variable histology with infiltrative lesions consisting of wither anaplastic cells and prominent Reed–Sternberg-like cells embedded in a background of histiocytes and lymphocytes;, immunoblasts, or centroblasts. These histological features are typically accompanied by the invasion and destruction (i.e. necrosis) of small blood vessels.

== Treatment ==
While DLBCL-CI is an aggressive malignancy, its treatment, particularly in localized disease, should include efforts to remove its underlying inflammatory causes. For example, PAL is a particularly aggressive form of DLBCL-CI. Nonetheless, surgical removal of the pleural tumor effectively treats the few cases in which it is highly localized and of low-grade. Historically, severe cases of PAL have been treated with chemotherapy regimens such as CHOP (i.e. cyclophosphamide, hydroxydoxorubicin, vincristine, and prednisone); Overall survival rates with this regimen have been poor, e.g. ~21% after 5 years. More recently, PAL has been treated with the immunochemotherapy regimen of R-CHOP, i.e. CHOP plus the immuotherpeutic agent, rituximab. Rituximab is a commercial monoclonal antibody that binds to the CD20 cell surface protein on B-cells to thereby target these cells for attack by the hosts adaptive immune system. The addition of rituximab to chemotherapy regimens such as CHOP has greatly improved the prognosis of most DLBCL variants and modestly improved the outcome in patients with the Epstein–Barr virus-positive diffuse large B-cell lymphoma, not otherwise specified variant of DLBCL. There are too few reports on the treatment of non-PAL forms of DLBCL-CI to make recommendations although the R-CHOP regimen is being used as first-line treatment for severe DLBCL-CI cases that are not PAT. The R-CHOP regimen or similar immunochemotherapeutic regimen (e.g. EPOCH, i.e. rituximab plus etoposide, prednisolone, oncovin, cyclophosphamide, and hydroxydaunorubicin) may prove useful for treating DLBCL-CI.

=== New treatment studies ===
An interventional phase II clinical trial testing the effectiveness and safety of R-CHOP versus R-CHOP plus lenalidomide (unclear mechanism of action) in 570 previously untreated participants with various forms of DLBCL, including DLBCL-CI, has finished recruitment of participants. It has an estimated study completion date of August 3, 2022.

A phase II clinical trial is recruiting individuals to study how well nivolumab with or without varlilumab works in treating patients with aggressive B-cell lymphomas, including DLBCL-CI, that have come back, or do not respond, to immunotherapy with either one of these monoclonal antibodies.

A phase I clinical trial is recruiting individuals to study the side effects and efficacy of CD19/CD22 chimeric antigen receptor T cells (i.e. T-cells from a donor patent are obtained, engineered to attack cells that express CD19 or CD22, and then injected back into the donor) when given together with chemotherapy in treating patients with DLBCL, including DLBCL-CI, or B-cell acute lymphoblastic leukemia. Only individuals whose neoplastic B-cells express the CD19 cell surface protein are eligible to enter this study.
