= Fibrin-associated diffuse large B-cell lymphoma =

- Specialty: Hematology, oncology
- Diagnostic method: Histology of involved tissue
- Prognosis: good to excellent
- Frequency: extremely rare
- Deaths: rare, none due directly to the disease

Fibrin-associated diffuse large B-cell lymphoma (FA-DLBCL) is an extremely rare form of the diffuse large B-cell lymphomas (DLBCL). DLBCL are lymphomas in which a particular type of lymphocyte, the B-cell, proliferates excessively, invades multiple tissues, and often causes life-threatening tissue damage. DLBCL have various forms as exemplified by one of its subtypes, diffuse large B-cell lymphoma associated with chronic inflammation (DLBCL-CI). DLBCL-CI is an aggressive malignancy that develops in sites of chronic inflammation that are walled off from the immune system. In this protected environment, the B-cells proliferate excessively, acquire malignant gene changes, form tumor masses, and often spread outside of the protected environment. In 2016, the World Health Organization provisionally classified FA-DLBCL as a DLBCL-CI. Similar to DLBCL-CI, FA-DLBCL involves the proliferation of EBV-infected large B-cells in restricted anatomical spaces that afford protection from an individual's immune system. However, FA-DLBCL differs from DLBCL-CI in many other ways, including, most importantly, its comparatively benign nature. Some researchers have suggested that this disease should be regarded as a non-malignant or pre-malignant lymphoproliferative disorder rather than a malignant DLBCL-CI.

FA-DLBCL is an Epstein–Barr virus-associated lymphoproliferative disease (EBV+ LPD), i.e. disease in which lymphocytes infected with the Epstein-Barr virus (EBV) proliferate excessively in one or more tissues. EBV infects ~95% of the world's population to cause no symptoms, minor non-specific symptoms, or infectious mononucleosis. The virus then enters a latency phase in which the infected individual becomes a lifetime asymptomatic carrier of the virus. Some weeks, months, years, or decades thereafter, a very small fraction of these carriers develop any one of various EBV-associated benign or malignant diseases. In FA-DLBCL as well as DLBCL-CI, EBV infects B-cells to promote their proliferation and thereby the development of either disease.

FA-DLBCL most commonly develops within immunologically sequestered sites such as body cavities (e.g. pseudocysts) and foreign bodies (e.g. artificial heart valves) where fibrin, a breakdown product of the blood clotting factor, fibrinogen, has deposited. It is almost always discovered as an incidental finding in specimens taken from these sites when they are examined for reasons not directly related to the FA-DLBCL infiltrates. As reviewed in a publication of 2019, the disorder has been diagnoses in 47 individuals who are predominantly elderly males; it is almost uniformly amenable to various treatments and takes a benign course. However, the disease, when occurring within vascular or cardiac sites, does have a risk of being complicated by the development of embolisms due to the dislodgement of blood clots that travel through the vascular system to cause, e.g. strokes.

== Presentation ==
Individuals with FA-DLBCL are typically males (~70% of cases) aged 25–96 years (~75% of cases are >50 years old). They present with abnormalities associated with a long-standing (1–20 years): a) cardiac myxoma (i.e. a myxoid tumor of primitive connective tissue in the heart's atrium); b) subdural hematoma (i.e. a collection of blood between the inner layer of the dura mater and the arachnoid mater of the meninges surrounding the brain; c) testicular hydrocele (i.e. fluid accumulation within the potential space between the two layers of the cavum vaginale, of a testicle); d) pseudocyst (i.e. a cyst that lacks epithelial or endothelial cells) or cyst of the kidneys, spleen, ovary, adrenal gland, retroperitoneal space, or other tissue; and e) intravascular thrombi; f) implants of a foreign body such as an artificial heart valve, joint replacement, or metal stent (i.e. a tube placed within a blood vessel to keep it open). Most cases have involved atrial myxomas (~31%), pseudocysts (~28%), prosthetic devices (23%), and chronic hematoma (18%). Symptoms of the disease are attributable to the pre-existing condition, not the FA-DLBCL that has developed in the immune-sequestered site.

== Pathogenesis ==
Current studies suggest that EBV transforms the B-cells which it infects into rapidly proliferating cells that in the case of FA-DLBCL are able to avoid attack by the immune system because they are in sites devoid of small blood vessels, overloaded with fibrin thrombi and/or debris resulting from the death of cells, and therefore lack inflammatory cells including cytotoxic T-cells, a specialized type of lymphocyte that can kill EBV-infected cells. These immune privileged sites are typically located in certain body cavities or on foreign bodies. Since the EBV-infected cells are subject to immune attack when they leave these sites, FA-DLBCL remains, it is thought, an otherwise non-invasive, non-metastasizing, site-limited disease. Unlike most other forms of DLBCL, including DLBCL-CI, the neoplastic cells in FA-DLBCL have relatively few gene abnormalities, or abnormal expressions of genes such as MYC and p53 which are implicated in the development of malignancy. However, programmed death-ligand 1 (PD-L1), which acts to suppress the adaptive arm of the immune system, is overexpressed in the neoplastic B-cells of FA-DLBCL and may contribute further to the ability of these cells to avoid immune attack.

== Diagnosis ==
FA-DLBCL is an incidental finding made by histological examination of tissues obtained at surgery conducted for reasons not related to FA-DLBCL. Microscopically, these tissues are composed of small foci of infiltrates composed of large lymphoid cells embedded in a background of fibrin or debris. Immunohistochemistry analyses reveals that the large neoplastic cells are B-cells by their expression of B-cell marker proteins (e.g. CD20, CD30, CD45, CD79a, PAX5, and MUM1) and are infected with the EBV by their expression of this virus's proteins, e.g. EBNA2 and LMP1. Typically, these cells evidence a high rate of proliferation and are activated rather than non-activated B-cells (i.e. germinal center B-cells or unclassifiable B-cells) as identified by immunohistochemical analyses (see activated B-cells). The lesions show relatively little or no evidence of chronic inflammation except for some cases arising in pseudocysts or chronic hematomas which may show lymphoplasmacytic cells (i.e. cells with combined morphologic features of lymphocytes and plasma cells) surrounding the neoplastic B cell infiltrates. The lesions also show no evidence of tumor mass formation at the site of disease and do not extend beyond their sites of origin.

=== Differential diagnosis ===
FA-DLBCL-CI and (FA-DLBCL) are B-cell lymphomas. Both diseases appear driven by EBV-infected (latency stage III), large, activated B-cells and develop in spaces known or thought to be sequestered from the immune system. Unlike DLBCL-CI, FA-DLBCL is discovered as an incidental infiltrate that develops in or around sites that are not involved in chronic inflammation such as pseudocysts, cysts foreign bodies, hematomas, thrombi formed in large arteries, and myxomas. Also unlike DLBCL-CI, the lesions in FA-DLBCL do not form masses and, in almost all cases, do not extend beyond their site of origin; typically, FA-DLBCL lesions are small infiltrates composed of sheets, ribbons, or clusters of proliferating large B cells within avascular tissues that are often coated with or contain abundant fibrin and usually have few or no other types of inflammatory cells. The disease often appears to be a non-malignant proliferation of EBV+ large B cells that are unable to survive outside of the sequestered sites: DLBCL-CI is an aggressive lymphoma with a five-year overall survival rate of 20–35% while FA-DLBCL, usually has a highly favorable outcome.

== Treatment ==
Cases of FA-DLBCL have been treated by surgery; chemotherapy regimens such as CHOP (i.e. cyclophosphamide, hydroxydaunorubicin, oncovin, and prednisone or prednisolone) or R-CHOP (i.e. rituximab plus CHOP); radiotherapy; or a combination of these modalities. Regardless of treatment type, 30 of the 36 cases of FA-DBCL for which there is follow-up results had a benign course with no disease recurrence over 1 to 130 months. All cases arising in pseudocysts had favorable results. Local recurrences of the disease in non-pseudocyst sites did occur but responded to further treatment. Three individuals with disease located in thrombi had serious thromboembolic complications; two of them died from this complication. One individual who had a FA-DLBCL removed from a subdural hematoma developed an Epstein-Barr virus-associated diffuse large B-cell lymphoma (EBV+DLBCL) at a site in the brain near the original hematoma; this case suggests that FA-DLBCL may transform into the far more malignant Epstein-Barr virus-associated lymphoproliferative disease, EBV+ DLBCL. The limited number of FA-DLBCL cases reported as of 2019 does not definitively show which of their treatment(s) is superior. However, the findings do suggest that cases amenable to complete surgical removal are cured by surgery alone and should be considered as an Epstein-Barr positive lymphoproliferative disease while disease in the heart, vasculature, or hematoma may be associated with serious complications and require chemotherapy.
