= Plexiform fibrohistiocytic tumor =

- Specialty: Dermatology

Plexiform fibrohistiocytic tumor is a rare tumor that arises primarily on the upper extremities of children and young adults.

== Signs and symptoms ==
Plexiform fibrohistiocytic tumor appears as a painless, slowly expanding soft tissue mass located in the dermis and subcutis. The skin layer above is somewhat elevated and occasionally has a central depression. The upper extremities were more commonly affected by plexiform fibrohistiocytic tumors. It was most frequently found on the fingers, hand, or wrist. The tumour's dimensions vary from 0.3 to 8.5 cm.

== Causes ==
Plexiform fibrohistiocytic tumor's pathogenesis is unclear. A few cases of prior trauma have been documented. Two series of congenital instances have been documented.

== Diagnosis ==
From a histological perspective, plexiform fibrohistiocytic tumor is made up of several tiny nodules or long fascicles that are primarily arranged in a plexiform pattern. Variable amounts of three distinct cell types are found. These are multinucleate large cells, mononuclear histiocyte-like cells, and spindle fibroblast-like cells.

There are three main well-documented histologic patterns that have been identified: a fibrohistiocytic subtype that consists of plexiform clusters of mononuclear histiocyte-like cells and multinucleated giant cells; a fibroblastic subtype that consists primarily of elongated clusters and short fascicles of spindle fibroblast-like cells; and a mixed subtype that consists of equal parts of both patterns.

The fibroblastic cells show uniform reactivity to vimentin and at least focal reactivity for smooth muscle actin, while the histiocytic cells of plexiform fibrohistiocytic tumor stain for CD68 (KP-1).

Differential diagnoses of plexiform fibrohistiocytic tumor include plexiform schwannoma, plexiform neurofibroma, cellular neurothekeoma, deep benign fibrous histiocytoma, fibrous hamartoma of infancy, dermatofibroma, benign and malignant soft tissue giant cell tumor, and myofibromatosis.

== Treatment ==
The treatment for plexiform fibrohistiocytic tumor is complete surgical resection.

== See also ==
- Sarcoma
