= Gastroblastoma =

- Specialty: Gastroenterology/oncology

Gastroblastoma is a rare cancer that occurs in the stomach. Only six cases have been reported to date (2017).

A single case of a similar lesion has been reported in the duodenum. The term "duodenoblastoma" has been suggested for this lesion.

== Signs and symptoms ==
These are non specific and include upper abdominal pain and fullness. Examination may reveal a mass.

The lesion may be investigated further by ultrasound, CT or MRI but diagnosis depends on endoscopic biopsy.

This lesion appears to have an indolent course but metastases have been reported in one case to date.

== Genetics ==
In four cases described a mutation - a fusion between the MALAT1 and GLI1 genes - has been described. This fusion causes over expression of the GLI1 protein and activation of the Sonic hedgehog pathway.

== Diagnosis ==
=== Histology ===
The tumour is biphasic and contains spindle and epithelial cells. The spindle cells form diffuse sheets. The epithelial cells occur in clusters which may form glandular structures.

=== Immunochemistry ===
The epithelial component is positive for keratin (keratin AE1/AE3, keratin 18, keratin 7) c-KIT and CD56.

The mesenchymal component is positive for CD10 and vimentin.

=== Electron microscopy ===
Desmosomes and microvilli are present.

=== Differential diagnosis ===
The histological differential diagnosis includes

- Carcinosarcoma
- Biphasic synovial sarcoma
- Teratoma
- Mixed tumor

=== Other rare stomach tumours ===
Several other rare tumours that may need to be considered in the differential diagnosis include

- Multiple minute gastrointestinal stromal tumor
- Interstitial cell of Cajal hyperplasia
- Nerve sheath tumors (schwannoma and perineurioma)
- Granular cell tumor
- Glomus tumor
- Plexiform angiomyxoid myofibroblastic tumor
- Primary clear cell sarcoma

== History ==
This tumour was first described in 2009. The authors described this lesion in two males and one female - ages 19, 27 and 30 years. Since its original description several further cases have been described.
