= TAN syndrome =

- Specialty: Dermatology

Tegumental angiomyxoma-neurothekeoma (TAN syndrome) is a syndrome named from an acronym proposed by a Malaysian ophthalmologist of Chinese descent, Tan Aik Kah (b. June 1975). Angiomyxomas are associated with LAMB (lentigines, atrial myxomas, muco-cutaneous myxomas, and blue naevi) syndrome, NAME (nevi, atrial myxoma, myxoid neurofibromas, and ephelides) syndrome and Carney syndrome (atrial, cutaneous and mammary myxomas, lentigines, blue naevi, endocrine disorders and testicular tumours).

TAN syndrome is characterized by multiple superficial angiomyxoma and neurothekeoma confined only to the skin (tegument). TAN syndrome may be used to describe myxomas confined to the skin without visceral involvement.

== Case ==
Tan et al. reported a 10-year-old girl with multiple superficial angiomyxoma associated with neurothekeoma palpebrae. There was no evidence of visceral involvement. The lesions were excised with no recurrence during follow up.
