= Superficial acral fibromyxoma =

Rare cutaneous condition

- Specialty: Dermatology

A superficial acral fibromyxoma is a type of myxoma and is a rare cutaneous condition characterized by a mesenchymal neoplasm that typically occurs on the digits of middle-aged adults.

== Signs and symptoms ==
Superficial acral fibromyxoma impacts the palm, heel, and ankle in addition to the acral regions, with a clear preference for the periungual and subungual regions of the fingers and toes. It begins as a slow-growing, solitary nodule limited to the dermis and subcutaneous tissue, and it is typically painless. They range in size from 0.6-5 cm. Fifty percent of the cases involve the nails, exhibiting either onycholysis or hyperkeratosis.

== Causes ==
Although a precise cause has not been identified, history of trauma is uncommon and has been documented.

== Diagnosis ==
A histologic examination reveals stellate and spindled fibroblast-like cells proliferating moderately within a myxoid and/or collagenous matrix with prominent microvasculature. There may be a hyperkeratotic overlaying epidermis. The tumor cells are distributed in a focally fascicular and loose storiform pattern. This tumor can be positively stained with CD34, CD99, vimentin, and CD10.

Differential diagnosis includes periungual and subungual fibroma, acquired digital fibrokeratoma, superficial angiomyxoma, myxoid neurofibroma, dermal mucinosis, sclerosing perineuroma, low grade fibromyxoid sarcoma, myxoid dermatofibrosarcoma protuberans, fibroma of tendon sheath, giant cell tumour, glomus tumour, fibrous histiocytoma, cutaneous myxoma and inflammatory myxohyaline tumour of distal extremities.

== Treatment ==
Complete excision, which typically prevents recurrence, and regular follow-up are recommended surgical therapy techniques.

== Outlook ==
Superficial acral fibromyxoma has a benign course. Though it is possible for the tumor to convert into a low-grade malignant tumor, no malignant transition has been documented till 2001. There have been reports of 22–24% local recurrence rates.

== Epidemiology ==
The majority of affected individuals are young adults (mean age: 46 years), with a 2:1 male to female ratio.

== See also ==
- Skin lesion
