= Facial Autologous Muscular Injection =

- Other names: Fat Autograft Muscular Injection
- Specialty: Plastic surgeon

Facial Autologous Muscular Injection is also known as Fat Autograft Muscular Injection, as Autologous Fat Injection, as Micro-lipoinjection, as Fat Transfer and as Facial Autologous Mesenchymal Integration, abbreviated as FAMI. The technique is a non-incisional pan-facial rejuvenation procedure using the patient's own stem cells from fat deposits. FAMI is an Adult stem cell procedure used to address the loss of volume in the face due to aging or surgery repair in restoring facial muscles, bone surfaces and very deep fat pads. The procedure involves removing adult stem cells of fatty tissue from lower body, and refining it to be able to re-inject living adipose stem cells into specific areas of the face without incision. FAMI is an outpatient procedure and an alternative to artificial fillers, blepharoplasty or various face lifts. The procedure does not require general anesthesia and risks of an allergic reaction are minimal due to the use of the patient's own tissue used as the facial injection.

== History ==
Fat transplantation procedures have been in use for decades to restore volume to the face, and as a result, various techniques have been developed over the years. Facial autologous muscular injection (FAMI) was developed from 1996 by Roger E. Amar M.D., a French plastic surgeon. Roger Amar is the founder and director of the AMARCLINIC which hosts the FAMI international Academy in Marbella, Spain. FAMI was introduced to the United States in 2001, and in 2010 in London UK. The FAMI procedure differs from other fat transplantation procedures in that it takes the patient's facial vascular paths into account while using their own fatty tissue to address the loss of volume in the face without having to make incisions.

== Indications ==
Facial autologous muscular injections are performed to rejuvenate the face of the patient and reduce the appearance of the natural effects of aging. The procedure can also be used to improve unsatisfactory results from other procedures such as a face-lift surgery. Indications include depressions or hollows across the face from aging, trauma or previous surgery as well as sagging jowls due to loss of volume in the upper face.

FAMI can be used in combination with surgery below the jawline to address the look of sagging necks and skeletonized faces, or faces that exhibit extreme skinny structures characterized by infraorbital hollowness usually due to weight loss.

== Procedure ==
Facial autologous muscular injections are procedures that target deep multiplane autologous fat. FAMI consists of an autograft of adult stem cells in order to rebuild muscles and bones. The adult stem cells are taken from an area of fatty tissue in a separate area of the body, typically from the patient's hip, knee or abdomen. The collected fat and stem cells are concentrated and refined. The stem cells are then re-injected into the muscles of the face. Specifically, the injections are made in close proximity or within the muscles responsible for facial expression.

By reconstructing the structures of the face with one's own adult stemcells, FAMI rejuvenates the patient's face with restored volume to the facial muscles and bones. FAMI procedures are not surgical, they are outpatient procedures that do not require the use of a scalpel or incisions, rather specially designed disposable cannulas that follow skull curvatures are used to transfer and place the fatty tissue around the face.

The results of the procedure are long-lasting, or relatively permanent due to the use of natural tissue rather than fillers and also because the injections are made to facial expression muscles and improve graft retention. Because it is a non-incisional procedure, facial autologous muscular injections are scar-less and results appear natural.

== Complications ==
FAMI procedures are non-surgical and done as outpatient procedure outside of a hospital. The procedure is minimally invasive and does not require the use of general anesthesia, however, local anesthesia is used to block the patient from feeling pain or discomfort. Complications from facial autologous muscular injections are very rare. From the 2011 Advanced Techniques in Liposuction and Fat Transfer report, it was noted that in 726 cases over 14 years there were no reports of complications such as cytosteatonecrosis, pseudocyst formation, infections or other issues.

== See also ==
- Autotransplantation
