= Proliferative fasciitis and proliferative myositis =

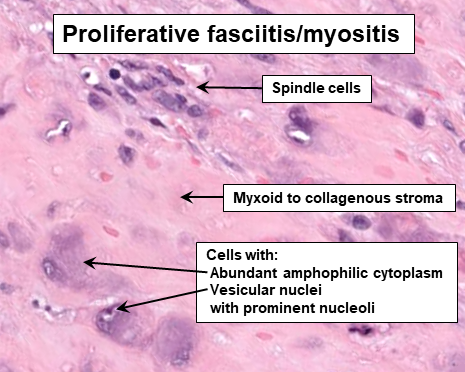
- Histopathology of proliferative fasciitis or proliferative myositis
- Specialty: Dermatology, General surgery
- Usual onset: Very rapid
- Duration: Often regresses spontaneously within weeks of diagnosis
- Treatment: symptomatic therapy, watchful waiting, surgical resection
- Prognosis: Excellent
- Frequency: Extremely rare

Proliferative fasciitis and proliferative myositis (PF/PM) are rare benign soft tissue lesions (i.e. a damaged or unspecified abnormal change in a tissue) that increase in size over several weeks and often regress over the ensuing 1–3 months. The lesions in PF/PM are typically obvious tumors or swellings. Historically, many studies had grouped the two descriptive forms of PF/PM as similar disorders with the exception that proliferative fasciitis occurs in subcutaneous tissues while proliferative myositis occurs in muscle tissues. In 2020, the World Health Organization agreed with this view and defined these lesions as virtually identical disorders termed proliferative fasciitis/proliferative myositis or proliferative fasciitis and proliferative myositis. The Organization also classified them as one of the various forms of the fibroblastic and myofibroblastic tumors.

PF/PM lesions have been regarded as a tissue's self-limiting reaction to an injury or unidentified insult rather than an abnormal growth of a clone of neoplastic cells, that is, as a group of cells which share a common ancestry, have similar abnormalities in the expression and/or content of their genetic material, and often grow in a continuous and unrestrained manner. However, a recent study has found a common genetic abnormality in some of the cells in most PF/FM tumors. This suggests that PF/PM are, in at least most cases, neoplastic but nonetheless self-limiting and/or spontaneously reversing disorders. That is, they are examples of "transient neoplasms." In all events, PF/PM lesions are benign tumor growths that do not metastasize.

PF/PM lesions may grow at alarming rates, exhibit abnormal histopathologies (e.g. high numbers and overcrowding of cells), and have other elements that are suggestive of a malignancy. Consequently, they have been mistakenly diagnosed as undifferentiated pleomorphic sarcoma (also termed malignant fibrous histiocytoma), rhabdomyosarcoma, or other types of sarcoma and treated unnecessarily with aggressive measures used for such malignancies, e.g. wide surgical resection, radiation therapy, and chemotherapy. The majority of PF/PM lesions are successfully treated with strictly conservative and supportive measures.

== Presentation ==
PF/PM lesions occur primarily in middle-aged and older adults (peak age of onset 50 to 55 years/old) with no appreciable differences in their incidences between males and females. Only very rare cases have been reported in children and adolescents. In up to 20% to 30% of cases, these lesions are apparently preceded by some sort of mechanical injury. Individuals commonly present within 1–3 weeks or, rarely, longer times (e.g. 3 months) of noticing a rapidly growing, small (<5 cm. in size) mass or swelling in the subcutaneous tissues or muscles of an extremity or, less commonly, the trunk wall, head, or neck areas. Uncommonly, the lesions are ulcerated. In rare cases, the lesions are extensive and highly disruptive, e.g. PF/PM has presented with lockjaw, i.e. a reduced ability to open the jaw due to a PF/PM lesion infiltrating and disrupting the function of the muscles of mastication (i.e. jaw-opening muscles). PF/PM lesions may be associated with tenderness, pain, and/or very rarely fever of unknown cause. The lesions may be regressing at the time of diagnose or, in rare instances, spontaneously regress beginning immediately after being biopsied. Very rarely, these lesions have evolved rapidly, compromised local blood flow, and/or recurred at the site where they were removed by conservative local surgical excision. However, PF/MF lesions do not metastasize to distant tissues.

== Pathology ==
PF/PM lesions are poorly circumscribed masses which on histopathological microscopic analyses consist of bland fibroblastic and myofibroblastic spindle-shaped cells mixed with variable proportions of giant epithelioid ganglion cell-like cells. These cells are in a myxoid (i.e. a clear, mucus-like substance which when prepared using a standard H&E staining method appears more blue or purple than the red color of normal tissues) to fibrous (i.e. high collagen fiber content) background which may contain areas of necrosis (i.e. sites of dead cells). Overall, the cells in these lesions are amphophilic or basophilic, may have vacuole-laden cytoplasm, are slowly multiplying based on their proliferative index, and lack atypical mitosis figures that might be suggestive of a malignancy. The presence of at least some giant epithelioid ganglion-like cells within this histopathological background are necessary and definitive evidence that a swelling or tumor is a PF/PM. Compared to adult cases, pediatric cases of PF/PM lesions are often better delineated from normal tissue, are more cellar, have a greater frequency of necrosis sites, contain diffuse sheets of epitheliod ganglion-like cell cells but lack a spindle-shaped cell component, and are lobulated. The spindle-shaped cells, but not epithelioid ganglion-like cell cells, in proliferative myositis lesions express smooth muscle actin proteins.

== Genetics ==
A recent study conducted in Japan found that the tumor tissues of 5 of 5 analyzed adult patients with PF/PM lesions expressed a high level of an abnormal c-Fos protein. This protein was a fusion protein formed by a chromosomal translocation between two disparate genes: the c-Fos gene (also termed FOS), a potential cancer-causing oncogene, normally located at chromosome band 24.3 on the long arm (i.e. q arm) of chromosome 14 and the VIM gene, normally located at band 13 on the short arm (i.e. p arm) of chromosome 10. The FOS:VIM fusion gene along with its c-Fos-VIM protein (which possesses uncontrolled c-Fos activity) are associated with the development and/or progression of some other fibroblastic and myofibroblastic tumors as well as malignant sarcomas. The FOS:VIM fusion gene and c-Fos-VIM fusion protein were found primarily in the epithelioid ganglion-like cell cells but mostly absent in the spindle-shaped cells of these lesion. The tumor of the single young person (1 year/old male) analyzed showed no evidence of this fusion gene or fusion protein. While these findings must be confirmed in a larger number of individuals, they do suggest that: 1) the FOS:VIM fusion gene and c-Fos-VIM fusion protein may contribute to the development of PF/PM in adults; 2) this fusion gene and its protein product may not be involved in childhood PF/PM tumors which also differ from adult PF/PM tumors in their histopathology (see the above Pathology section); and 3) the epithelioid ganglion-like cells but not spindle-shaped cells or any other cell types in adult PF/PM tumors may be neoplastic. It is further suggested that spontaneously reversing and self-limiting PF/PM tumors in adults are "transient neoplasms" similar to other theorized transient neoplasms such as nodular fasciitis myositis ossificans, aneurysmal bone cyst, and giant cell lesion of small bones. Two other genetic abnormalities have been reported in PF/PM tumors: trisomy 2 (i.e. the presence of an extra chromosome 2) in the tumor cells of two cases and a translocation of genetic material between band 23 on the long arm of chromosome 6 and band 32 on the long arm of chromosome 14 in the tumor cells of one case. Neither of these abnormalities have been validated, further characterized, or confirmed in other studies. Finally, 2 of 20 proliferative fasciitis tumors tested positive for the abnormal expression of FOSB protein, a product of the FOSB oncogene.

== Diagnosis ==
The diagnosis of PF/PM lesions depends or their presentation and, most importantly, their histopathology showing the presence of epithelioid ganglion-like cell cells. The presence of at least some of these signature cells in a lesion with an appropriate presentation in either a soft tissue or muscle tissue is considered definitive evidence that the lesion is a PF/PM. Analyses of tumor tissues for c-FOS may turn out be another useful marker for PF/PM.

== Treatment and prognosis ==
The primary treatment for PF/PM lesions is watchful waiting, i.e. following the lesions for spontaneous regression or any possible complications that require surgical intervention. Symptomatic therapy such as analgesics, e.g. nonsteroidal anti-inflammatory drugs, may be required to treat pain or rare cases of fever. Rare PF/PM lesions may require surgical excision when, for example, they interfere with blood flow or produce a painful, poorly functional hand due to the tumor inducing a trigger finger, Surgical resections in these cases are generally curative.
