= Ossifying fibromyxoid tumour =

Ossifying fibromyxoid tumor
- Specialty: Oncology

An ossifying fibromyxoid tumor is a type of myxoma. It presents in the extremities more frequently than the trunk. It is derived from mesenchyme. Appearance in the head and neck is rare, but has been reported. Its malignancy has been characterized as "intermediate".
