= Myxoid tumor =

Connective tissue tumor composed of clear, mucoid substance

A myxoid tumor is a connective tissue tumor with a "myxoid" background, composed of clear, mucoid substance.

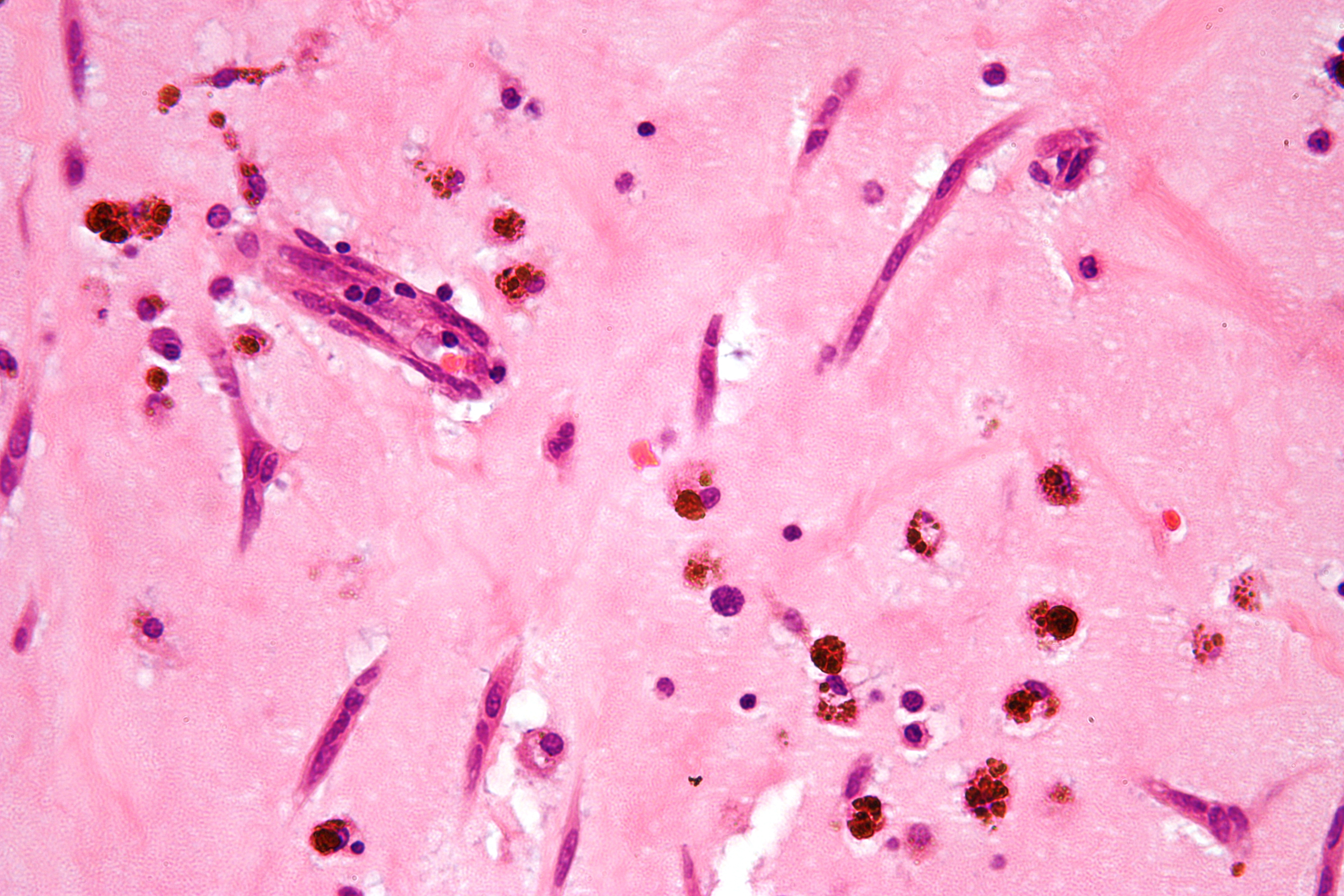
Atrial myxoma

This tumoral phenotype is shared by many tumoral entities:

- Myxomas
  - Atrial myxoma
  - Odontogenic myxoma
  - Cutaneous myxoma
  - Intramuscular myxoma
- Myxoid hamartoma
- Aggressive angiomyxoma
- Myxoid leiomyoma
- Chondromyxoid fibroma
- Myxoid neurofibroma
- Nerve sheath myxoma (neurothekeoma)
- Myxolipoma
- Angiomyofibroblastoma
- Myxoid leiomyosarcoma
- Myxoid liposarcoma
- Lipoblastoma
- Myxofibrosarcoma
- Myxoid cortical adenoma
- Pleomorphic adenoma
- Undifferentiated embryonal sarcoma
- Plexiform angiomyxoid myofibroblastic tumor
- Myxoid plexiform fibrohistiocytic tumor
- Angiomyxolipoma (vascular myxolipoma)
- Parachordoma
- Acral myxoinflammatory fibroblastic sarcoma
