= Myxoid liposarcoma =

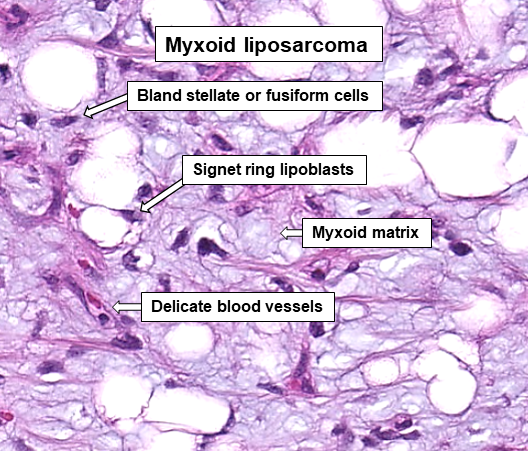
- Histopathologic image of myxoid liposarcoma arising in the thigh. H & E stain.
- Specialty: Oncology

A myxoid liposarcoma is a malignant adipose tissue neoplasm of myxoid appearance histologically.

Myxoid liposarcomas are the second-most common type of liposarcoma, representing 30–40% of all liposarcomas in the limbs, occurring most commonly in the legs, particularly the thigh, followed by the buttocks, retroperitoneum, trunk, ankle, proximal limb girdle, head and neck, and wrist. They occur in the intermuscular fascial planes or deep-seated areas. They present as a large, slow-growing, painless mass.

The neoplastic cells in these neoplasms contain chromosomal translocations which create one of two fusion genes: the FUS-DDIT3 in ~90% and the EWSR1-DDIT3 fusion gene in up to 10% of myxoid liposarcoma cases. The FUS-DDIT3 fusion gene forms by a merger of part of the FUS FET gene family gene normally located at band 11.2 on the short (or "p") arm of chromosome 16 with part of the DDIT3 ETS transcription factor family gene normally located at band 13.3 on the long (or "q") arm of chromosome 12. This fusion gene is notated as t(12;16)(q13;p11). Preclinical studies, i.e. laboratory studies, suggest that the FUS-DDIT3 fusion gene may act as an oncogene to promote the development of myxoid liposarcomas. The EWSR1-DDIT3 fusion gene forms by a merger of the EWSR1 FET gene family gene located at band 12.2 on the q arm of chromosome 22 with part of the DDIT3 gene. This fusion gene is notated as t(12;22)(q13;12).

== Additional images ==
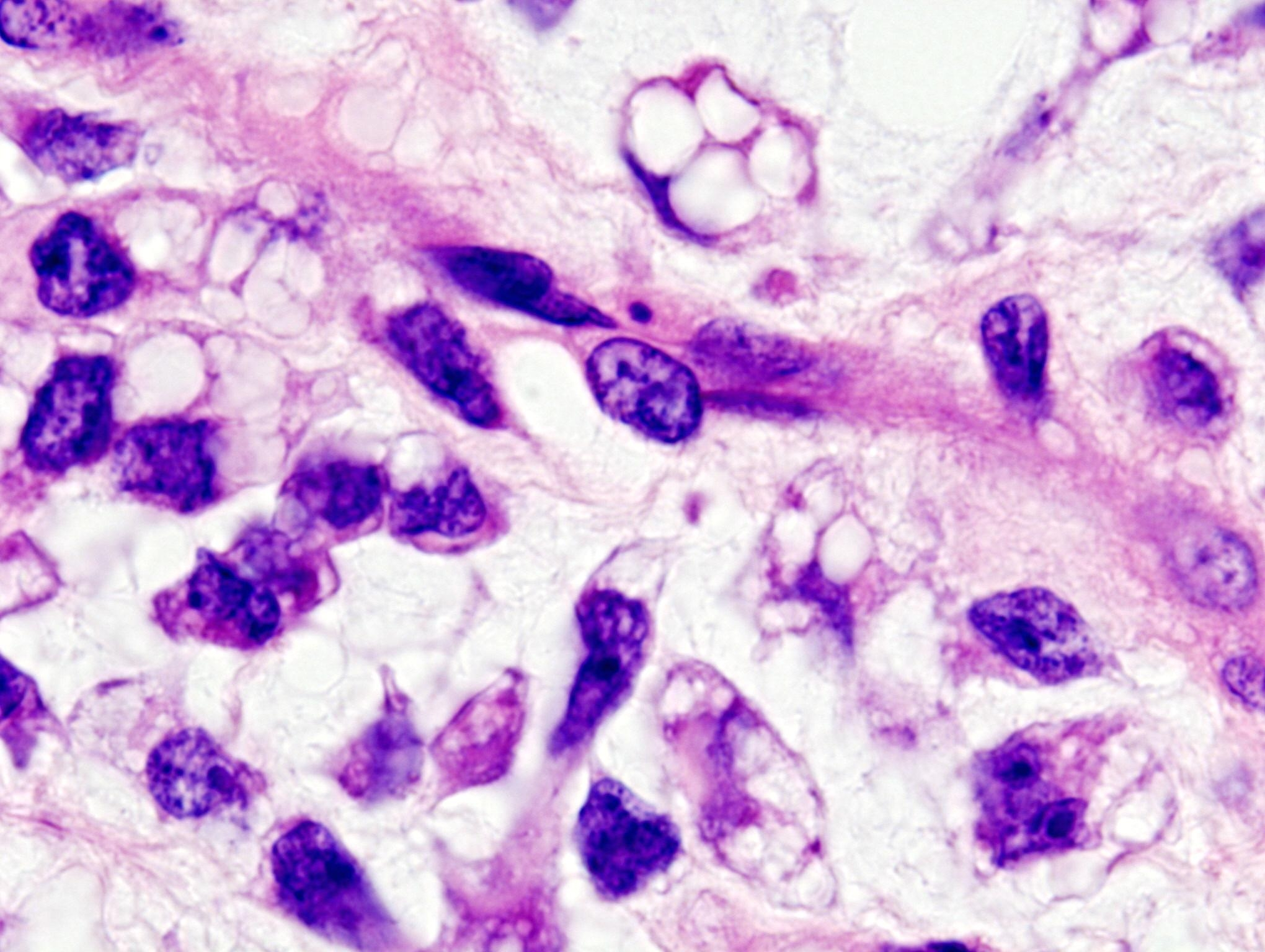
Micrograph of myxoid liposarcoma. H&E stain

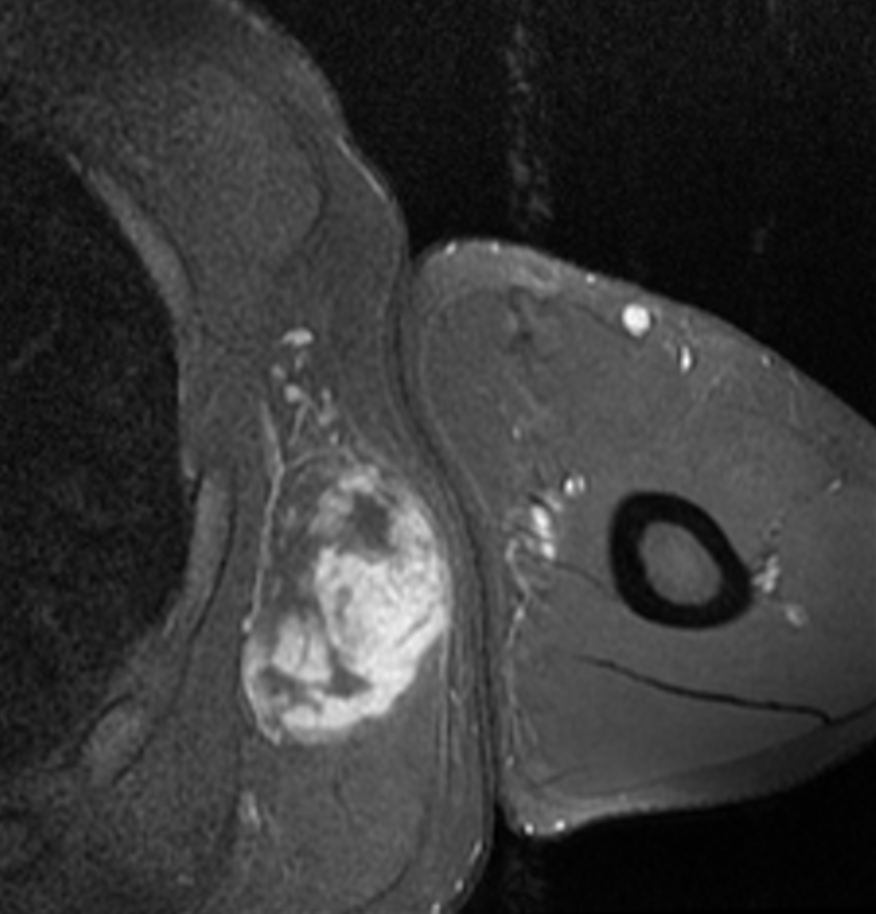
MRI of myxoid liposarcoma of high grade, in left axillary region of 40 year old man. Horizontal section.

== See also ==
- Lipoma
- Trabectedin
