= Plexiform angiomyxoid myofibroblastic tumor =

Rare benign gastric tumor

Plexiform angiomyxoid myofibroblastic tumor (PAMT), also called plexiform angiomyxoma, plexiform angiomyxoid tumor, or myxofibroma, is an extremely rare benign mesenchymal myxoid tumor along the gastrointestinal tract. Most of PAMTs occur in the gastric antral region, but they can be situated anywhere in the stomach. There is one recorded case of PAMT located in duodenum.

== Classification ==
PAMT was first described by Takahashi et al. in 2007. Estimated frequency of PAMT is less than 1/150 compared to that of gastrointestinal stromal tumors (GISTs). The prevalence is similar in both genders and can develop at any age (7–75 years). The size of tumor ranges from 1.9 to 15.0 cm and the mean value is 6.3 cm.

PAMT is considered as a benign tumor, due to its histological features such as the presence of bland tumor cells, low proliferation index, low mitotic-rate, absence of necrosis and vascular invasion and no recurrence. In one case there has been reported vascular invasion, thus possibility of malignant transformation cannot be excluded. But the limited number of reported cases is insufficient to draw any conclusion. The true biological potential of PAMT remains unknown due to its infrequency.

== Presentation ==
Most patients present certain symptoms including anaemia due to hematemesis, ulceration, gastric outlet obstruction, fistulating abscess formation, intermittent epigastric discomfort and abdominal pain, nausea, vomiting, weight loss, or could be asymptomatic with incidental finding.

== Diagnosis ==
Accurate diagnosis of early PAMT is difficult, but there are certain morphological and immunophenotypic features enabling differentiation of this tumor from GIST or other mesenchymal gastric tumors. The diagnosis of submucosal tumors is performed by endoscopic ultrasonography (EUS), whereas the tumor phenotype and the tumor cell type can be evaluated by EUS-guided fine needle aspiration and immunohistochemical analysis.

Immunohistochemically, the tumour cells show positive staining for vimentin and smooth muscle actin (SMA). Focal desmin positivity may be present. The tumour cells are generally negative for CD117, DOG1, SMA, Caldesmon, CD34, Epithelial membrane antigen (EMA), Cytokeratin or Anaplastic lymphoma kinase (ALK). Focal CD10 positivity can be observed. The pattern of positivity indicates the myofibroblastic nature of the tumour cells.

== Pathological features ==
Macroscopically, the tumour manifests as elevated or polypoidal mass lesion most commonly affecting the antral region of the stomach, however, in some cases fundus and body of the stomach as well as esophagus might be involved. Duodenal bulb or the pylorus are involved roughly in 33% cases.

Microscopically, the gastric wall shows a characteristic multinodular plexiform pattern of the tumour. The uppermost layer of mucosa is in many cases ulcerated. The fascicular arrangement of the tumour can be observed focally. The tumour cells are entrenched in a highly vasculated myxoid background.

The vessels are thin arborizing with or without thrombi. The individual tumour cells are spindle to ovoid shaped, with indistinct cell borders, bland nuclear chromatin, inconspicuous nucleoli, and scant eosinophilic cytoplasm. Mitotic rate is low. Stromal collagenisation is inconspicuous. The myxoid background stroma stain positive for Alcian blue stain. Many mast cells can be seen dispersed in the stroma.

== Treatment ==
Currently, the treatment of choice for PAMTs is distal or partial gastrectomy. Further studies could provide more information about its histogenesis and molecular signature that could be applied in targeted therapeutic approach.

== Prognosis ==
PAMT has a seemingly good prognosis without reported relapse or metastasis. Due to tumors small size and a good prognosis it is possible to remove this tumor by endoscopic submucosal dissection (ESD) under gastroscopy at an early stage.
