= UPP1 =

Protein-coding gene in the species Homo sapiens

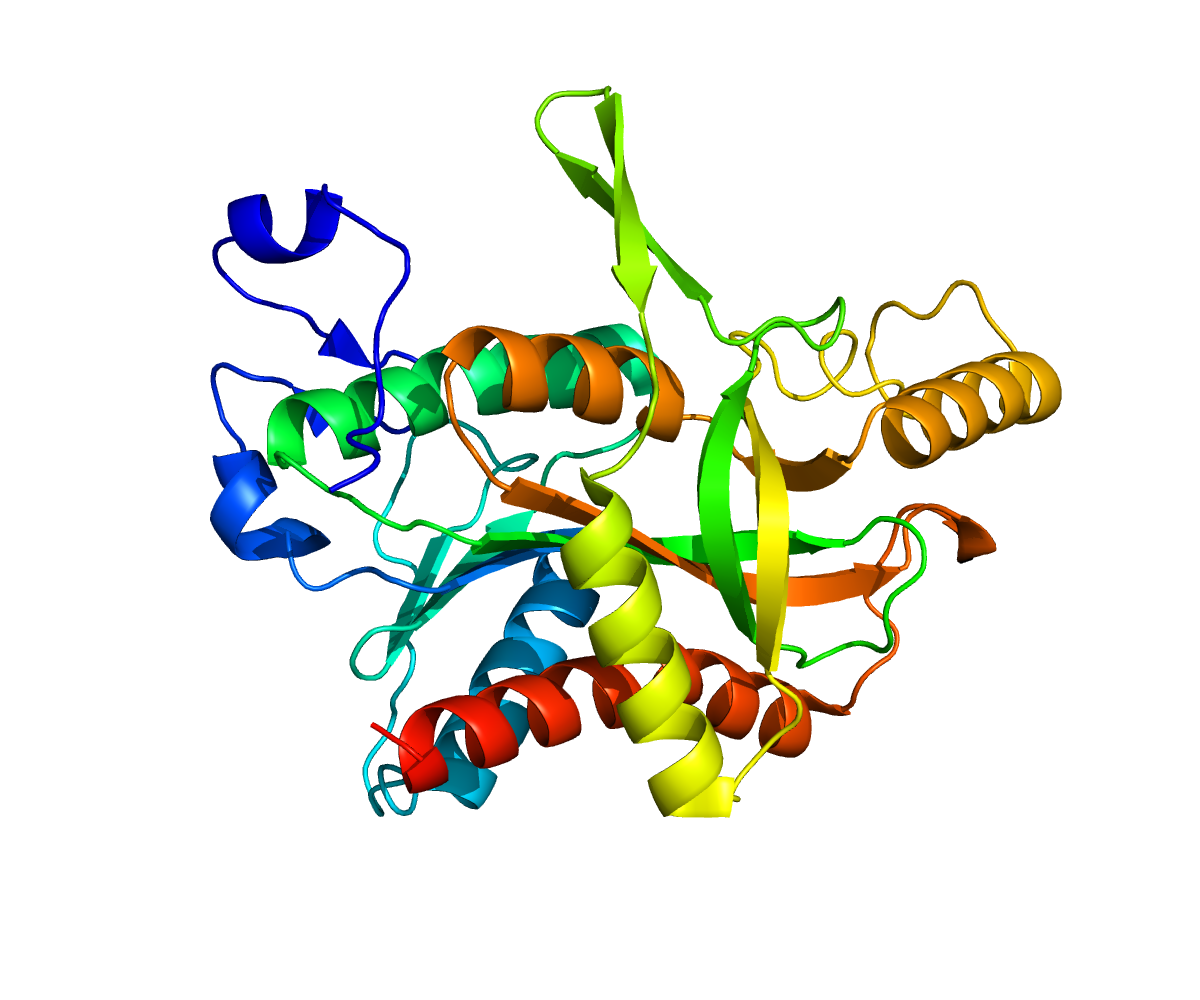
Available structures
PDB	Ortholog search: PDBe RCSB
PDB	List of PDB id codes 3EUE, 3EUF, 3NBQ

Identifiers
- Aliases: UPP1, UDRPASE, UP, UPASE, UPP, uridine phosphorylase 1
- External IDs: OMIM: 191730; MGI: 1097668; HomoloGene: 2524; GeneCards: UPP1; OMA:UPP1 - orthologs

Gene location (Human)
Chr.	Chromosome 7 (human)
Band	7p12.3	Start	48,088,628 bp
Band	7p12.3	End	48,108,736 bp

Gene location (Mouse)
Chr.	Chromosome 11 (mouse)
Band	11|11 A1	Start	9,068,103 bp
Band	11|11 A1	End	9,086,170 bp
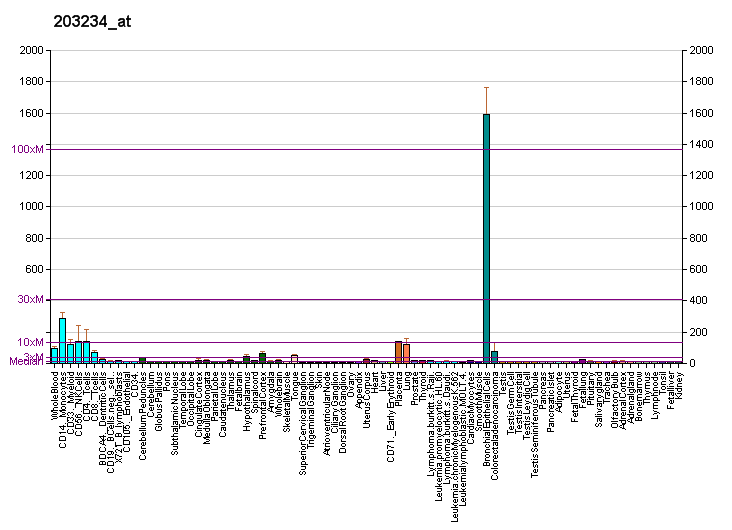
RNA expression pattern
Bgee	Human / Mouse (ortholog); Top expressed in: right hemisphere of cerebellum; granulocyte; upper lobe of left lung; monocyte; gonad; blood; buccal mucosa cell; mucosa of transverse colon; right frontal lobe; right lung / Top expressed in: jejunum; duodenum; conjunctival fornix; primary oocyte; blastocyst; granulocyte; left colon; corneal stroma; mucous cell of stomach; endothelial cell of lymphatic vessel; More reference expression data
BioGPS	More reference expression data
Gene ontology
Molecular function	transferase activity; catalytic activity; pentosyltransferase activity; glycosyltransferase activity; uridine phosphorylase activity
Cellular component	cytoplasm; cytosol; nucleus; nucleoplasm
Biological process	pyrimidine nucleoside salvage; pyrimidine nucleotide metabolic process; nucleoside metabolic process; uridine metabolic process; nucleotide catabolic process; cellular response to glucose starvation; nucleobase-containing compound metabolic process; pyrimidine nucleoside catabolic process; UMP salvage; uridine catabolic process
Sources:Amigo / QuickGO
Orthologs
Species	Human	Mouse
Entrez	7378	22271
Ensembl	ENSG00000183696	ENSMUSG00000020407
UniProt	Q16831	P52624
RefSeq (mRNA)	NM_001287426; NM_001287428; NM_001287429; NM_001287430; NM_003364 NM_181597; NM_001362774	NM_001159401; NM_001159402; NM_009477
RefSeq (protein)	NP_001274355; NP_001274357; NP_001274358; NP_001274359; NP_003355 NP_001349703	NP_001152873; NP_001152874; NP_033503
Location (UCSC)	Chr 7: 48.09 – 48.11 Mb	Chr 11: 9.07 – 9.09 Mb
PubMed search
- Wikidata
View/Edit Human	View/Edit Mouse

Uridine phosphorylase 1 is an enzyme that in humans is encoded by the UPP1 gene. It belongs to the uridine phosphorylase enzyme family.

== Interactions ==
UPP1 has been shown to interact with Vimentin.

== Interactive pathway map ==
Click on genes, proteins and metabolites below to link to respective articles. (Note: The interactive pathway map can be edited at WikiPathways: "FluoropyrimidineActivity_WP1601".)

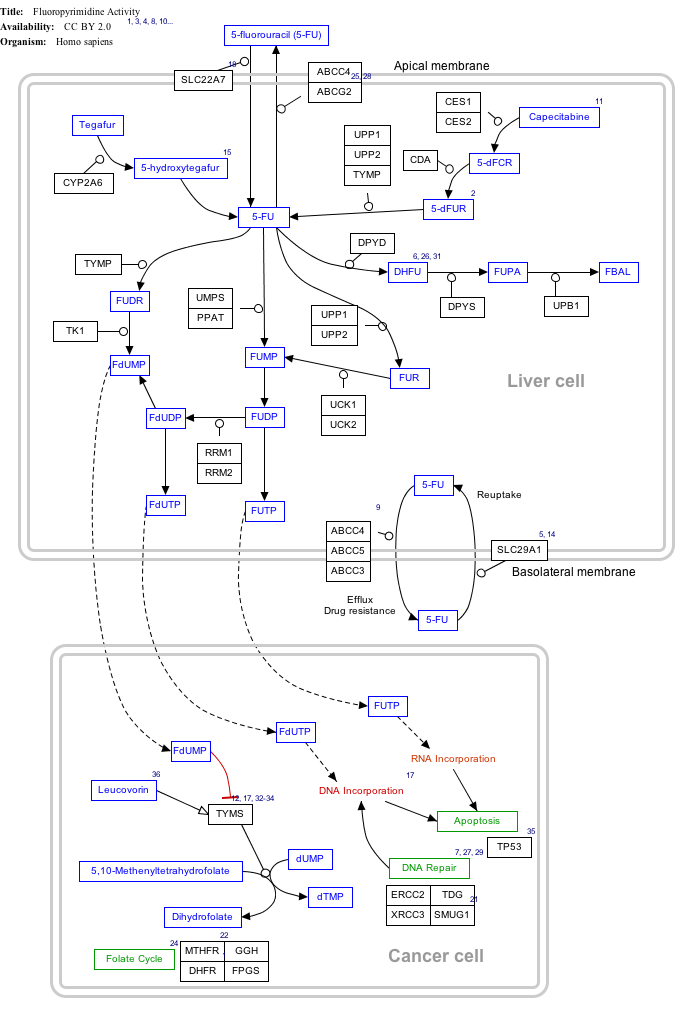

Fluorouracil (5-FU) Activity edit
