= Aggressive angiomyxoma =

Angiomyxoma
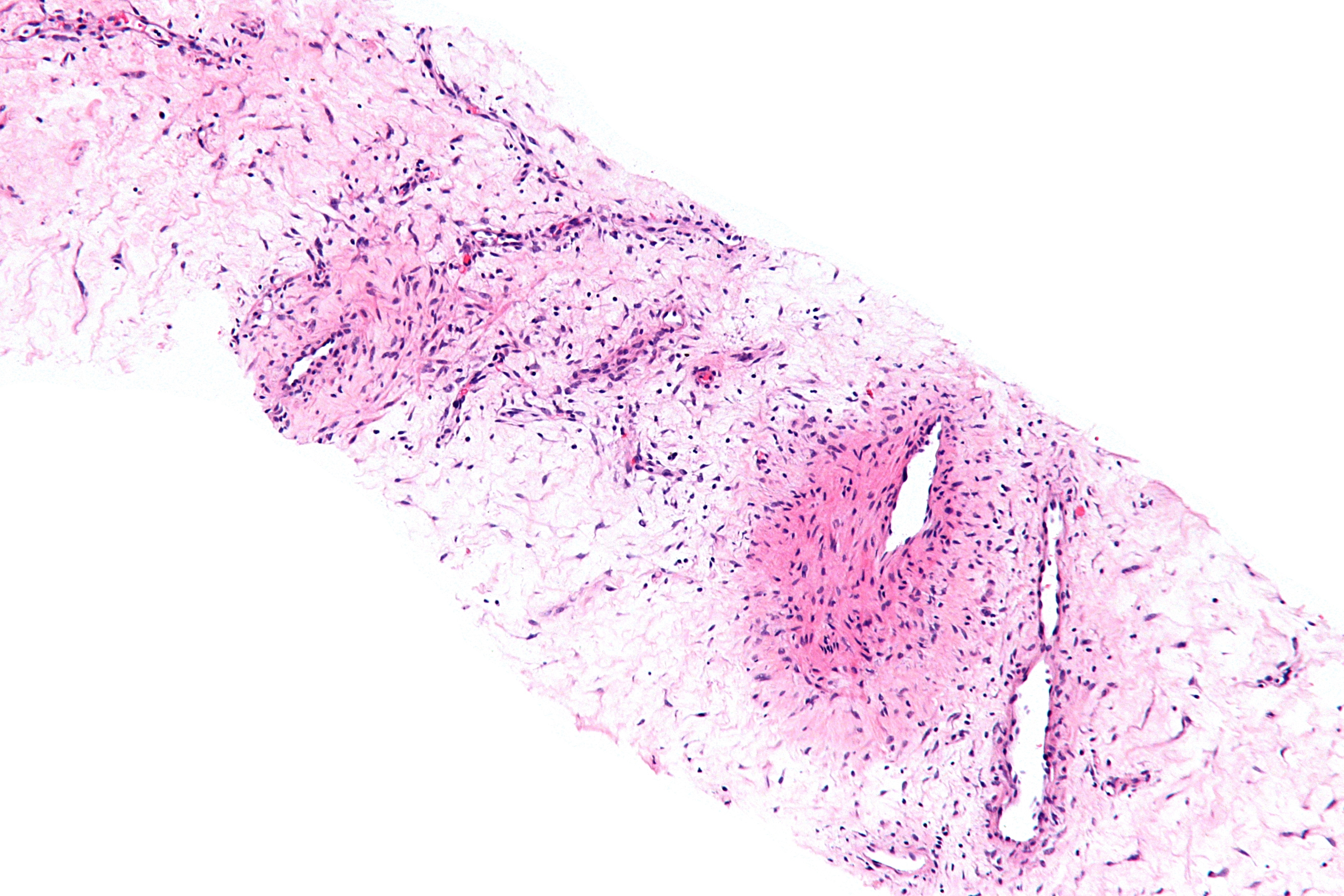
- Micrograph of an aggressive angiomyxoma. Core biopsy. H&E stain.
- Specialty: Vascular system

Angiomyxoma is a myxoid tumor involving the blood vessels.

It can affect the vulva and other parts of the pelvis. The characteristic feature of this tumor is its frequent local recurrence and it is currently regarded as a non-metastasizing benign tumor.

== Genetics ==
- HMGA2 rearrangement
  - by translocation t(12;21)(q15;q21.1)
  - by translocation t(11;12)(q23;q15)
  - by translocation t(8;12)(p12;q15)
- t(5;8)(p15;q22)

== Pathology ==
=== Microscopy ===
- Vascular appearance of tumor
- Hypocellular mesenchymal lesion
- Spindled and stellate cells with an ill-defined cytoplasm
- Cells loosely scattered in a myxoid stroma
- No evidence of nuclear atypia and mitosis
- Numerous, thin-to-thick wall vessels of different sizes
- Myxoid, hypocellular background
- Bland cytological appearance of spindle cells

=== Microscopical views ===
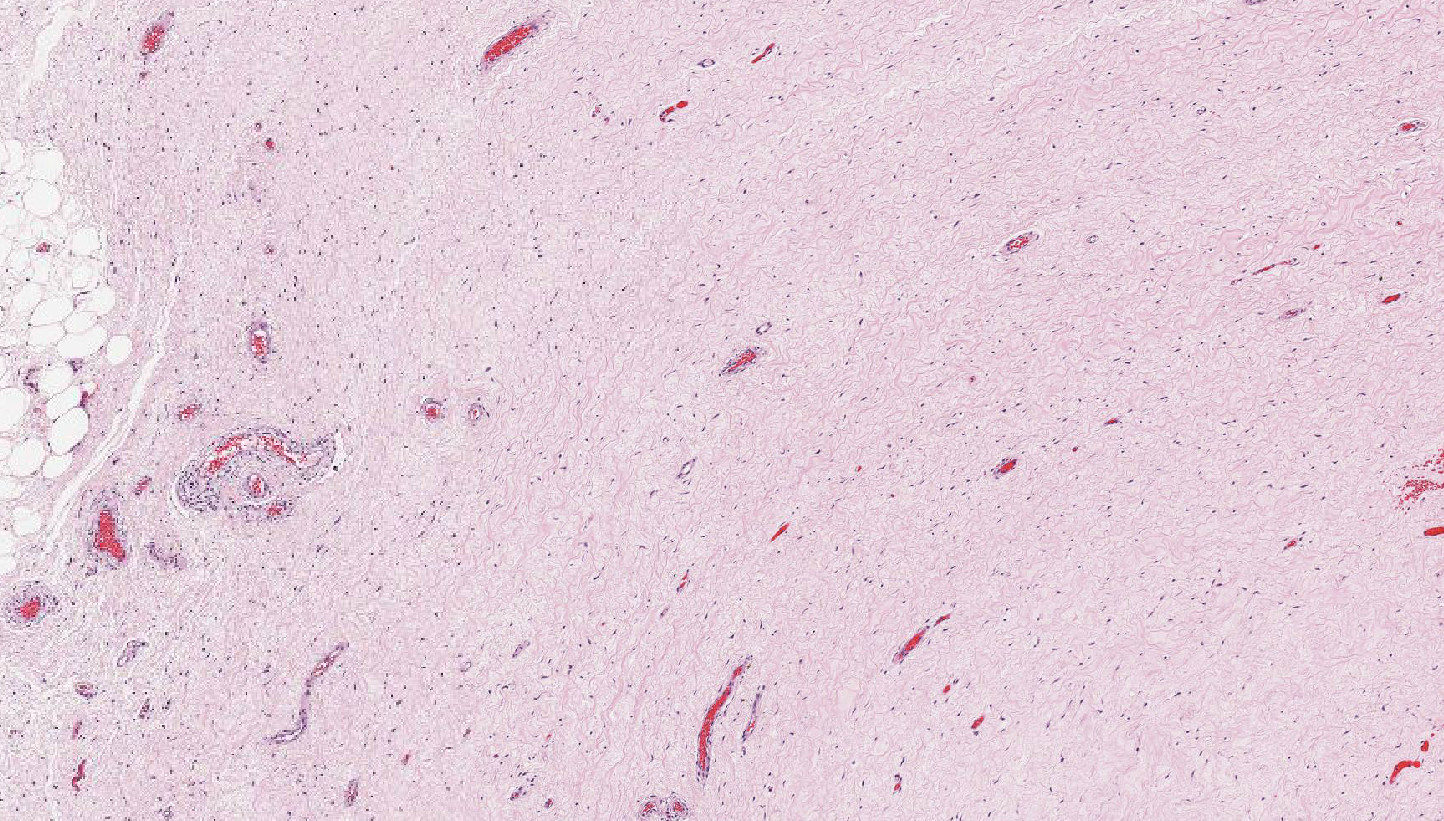

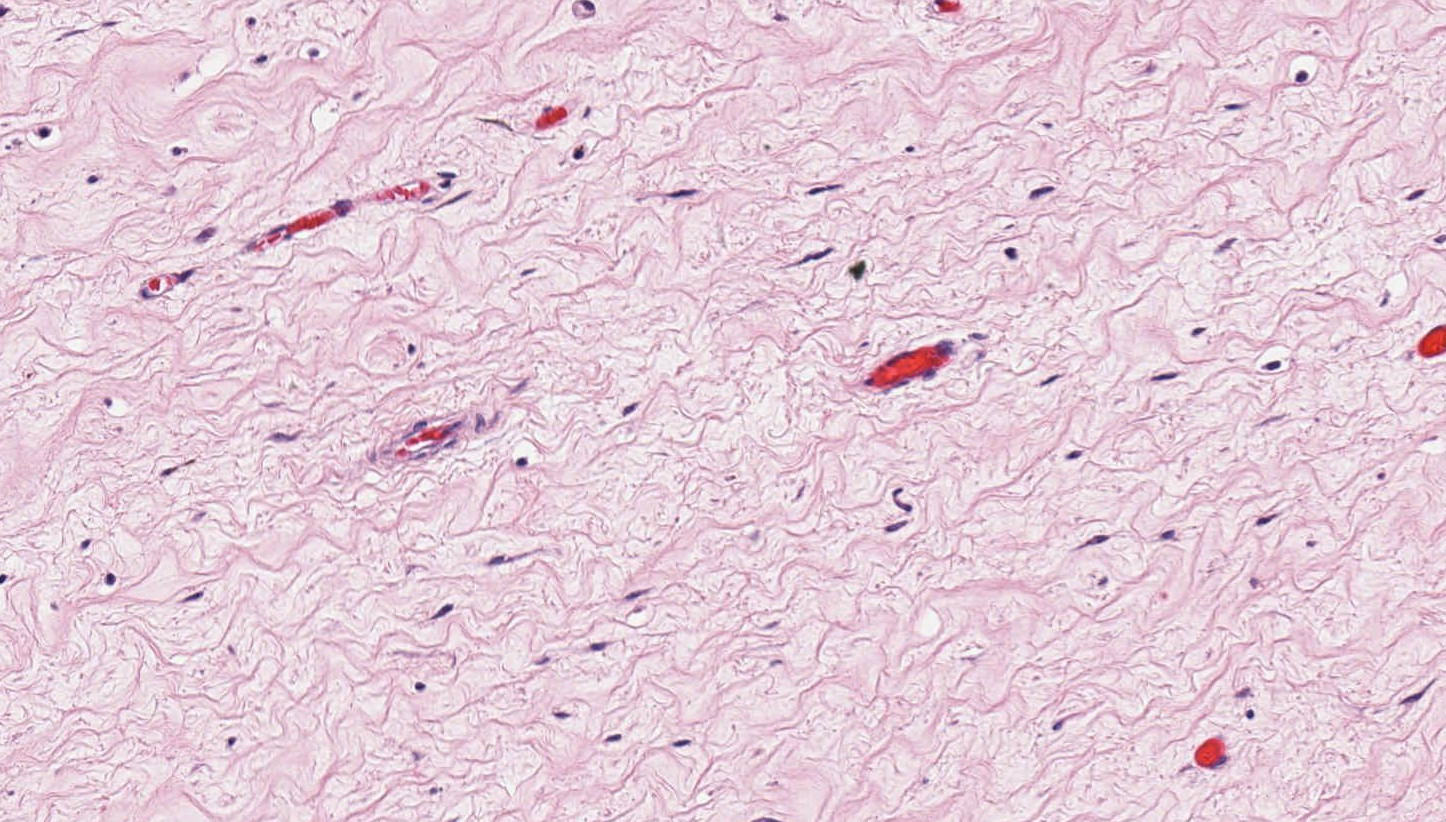

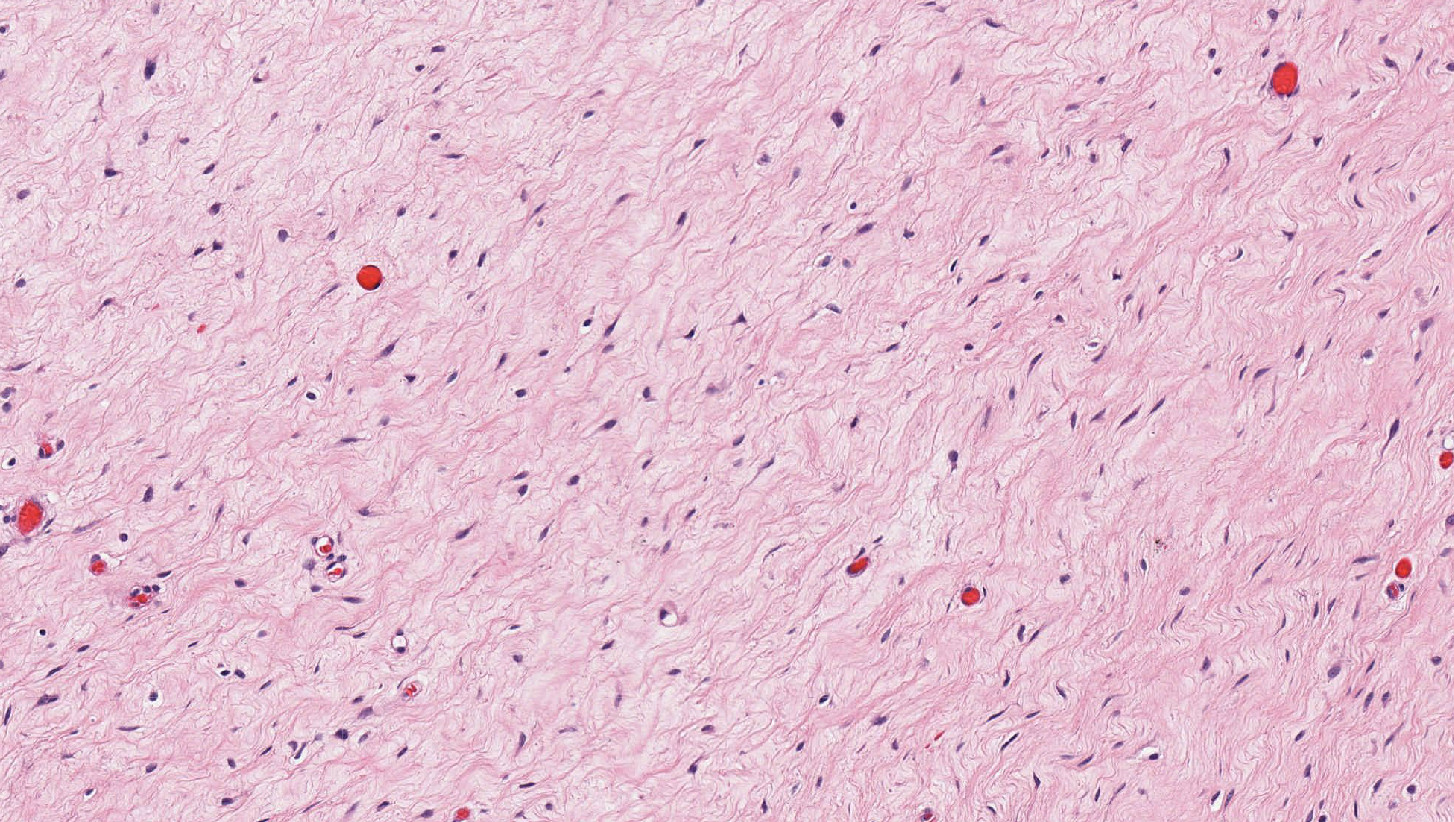

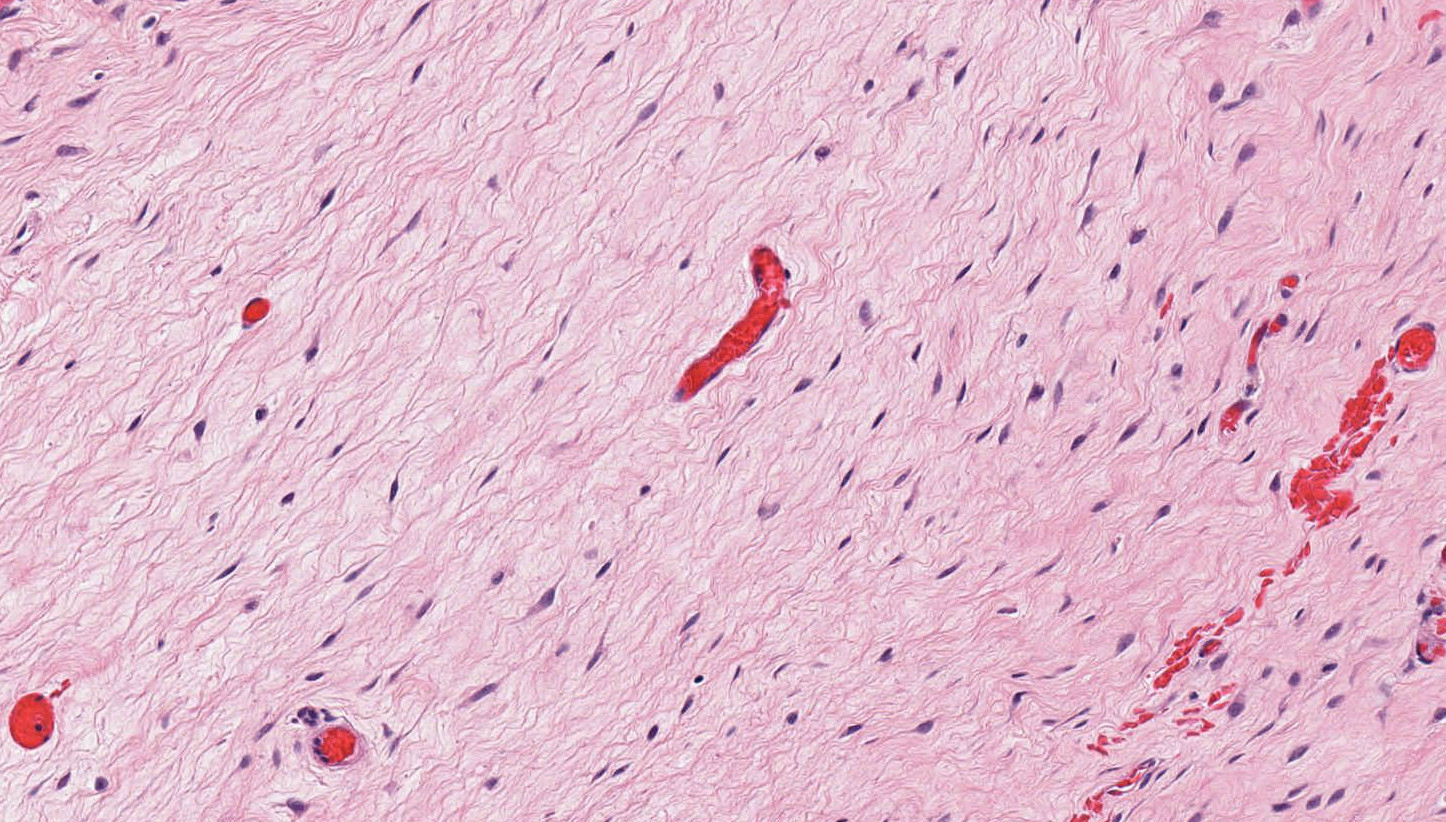

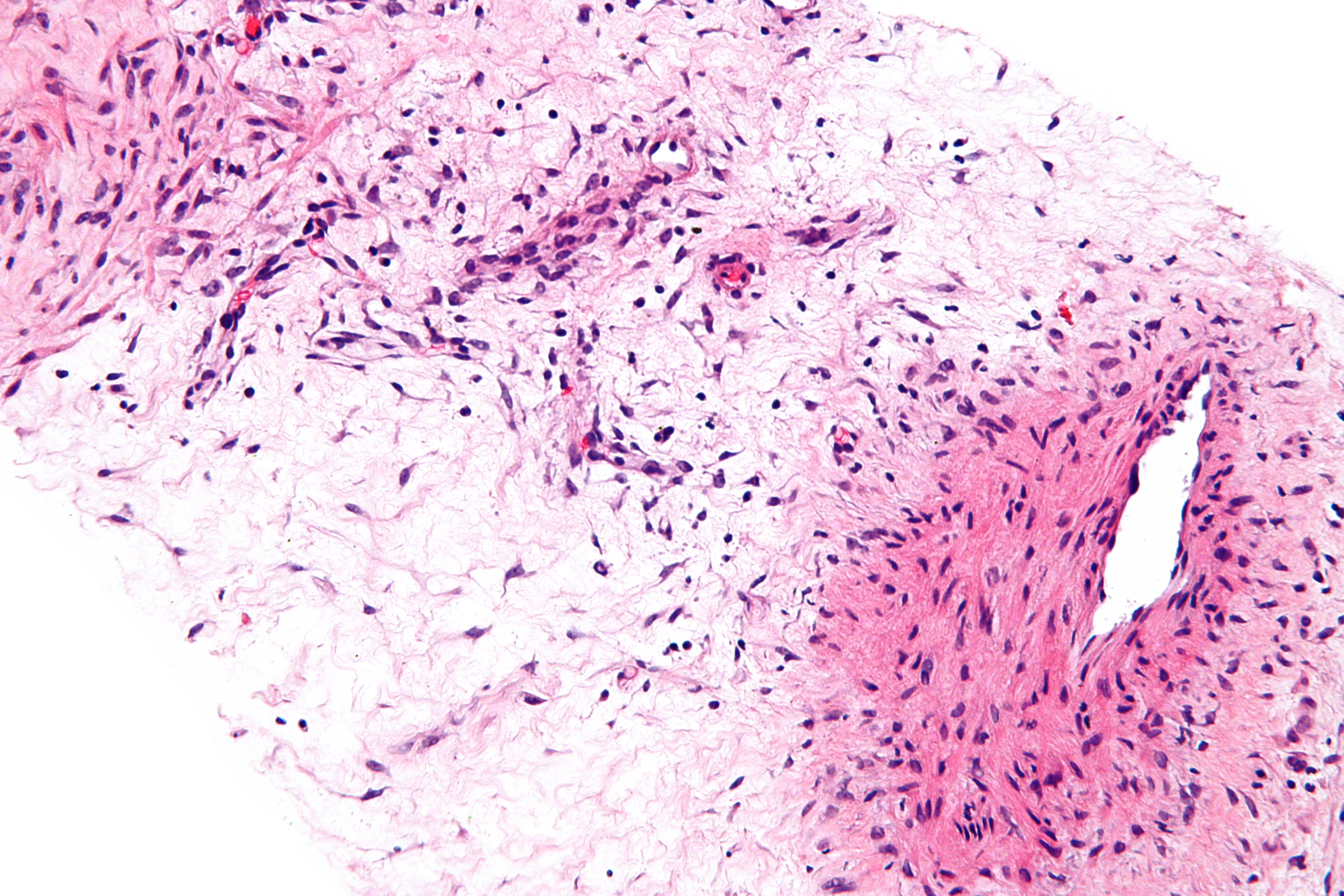

=== Immunochemistry ===
Immunohistochemical studies show strong staining for desmin, estrogen receptors, and progesterone receptors. Staining for actin, CD34 and smooth muscle actin are intermediate. Staining for S-100 protein is negative.

== Diagnosis ==
=== Differential diagnosis ===
- Myxoid tumors
  - Angiomyofibroblastoma

== Prognosis ==
Although it is a benign tumour and does not invade neighbouring tissues, it has a tendency to recur after surgical excision so it is termed "aggressive". Recurrence can occur as early as six months from initial resection. Patients frequently present at tertiary medical centers with a history of labial mass (sometimes misdiagnosed as Gartner's cyst), with multiple surgical excisions from several surgeons. There is no standard medical therapy; agents reported to be effective in case reports include systemic hormonal therapy with SERMs such as tamoxifen or LHRH agonists (leuprolide), and cytotoxic ("traditional") chemotherapy, as well as radiation therapy especially for recurrent disease.

== History ==
Aggressive angiomyxoma was originally described in 1983, but the term angiomyxoma dates back to at least 1952.

== See also ==
- Myxoma
- Cutaneous myxoma (Superficial angiomyxoma)
