= Myxoma =

Myxoid tumor of primitive connective tissue

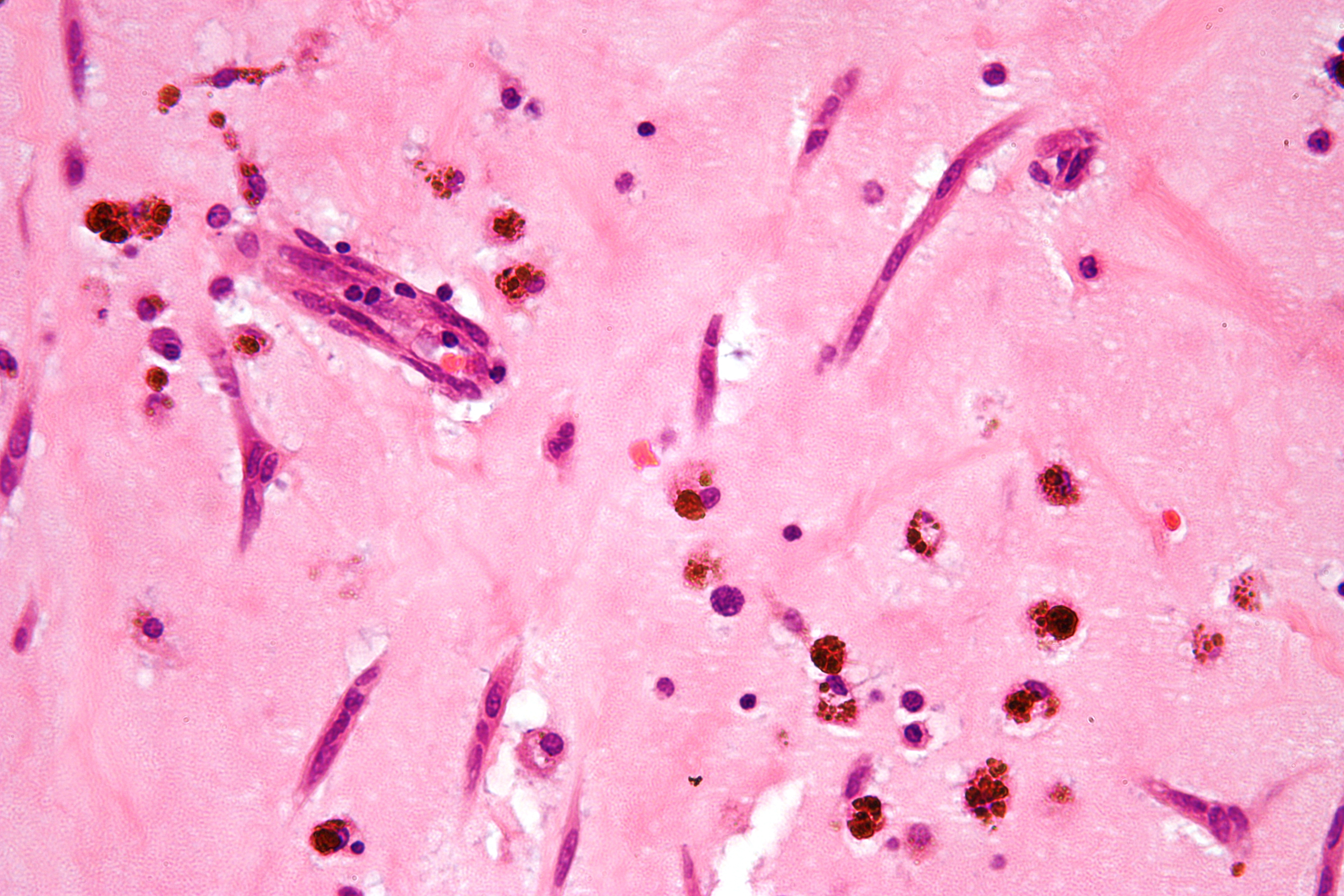
- Micrograph of an atrial myxoma. H&E stain.
- Specialty: Oncology

A myxoma (New Latin from Greek muxa 'mucus') is a myxoid tumor of primitive connective tissue. It is most commonly found in the heart (and is the most common primary tumor of the heart in adults) but can also occur in other locations.

== Types ==
Table below:

Myxoma	Margin	Vascular pattern	Cellularity	Stroma	Staining characteristics	Recurrence rate	Image (see Histology)
Cutaneous myxoma or Superficial angiomyxoma	Poor to moderately circumscribed, multilobular	Scattered thin-walled vessels	Moderately cellular, bland spindled and stellate cells, variable inflammatory cell infiltrate	Abundant mucin with clefts. Up to 30% have an associated epithelial component	Vimentin; variable staining with CD34, factor XIIIA, SMA^{1}, MSA^{2} and S-100	20–30%	Cutaneous Myxoma
Intramuscular myxoma	Poorly circumscribed merges with surrounding muscle	Hypovascular variant; hypervascular variant	Hypocellular variant; hypercellular variant; bland spindle cells	Abundant mucin with cystic spaces. Hypercellular variant has strands of collagen	Vimentin; variable staining with actin, desmin, CD34	None	
Juxta-articular myxoma	Poorly circumscribed infiltrates surrounding tissue	Focally vascular	Focally hypercellular, peripheral spindle cells with occasional atypical cells and mitoses	Abundant mucin, 89% of cases contain cystic spaces lined by fibrin or collagen	Vimentin; variable staining with actin, desmin, CD34	34%	
Aggressive angiomyxoma	Infiltrative	Uniformly distributed medium-sized blood vessels often with prominent hyalinization	Low to moderately cellular, evenly distributed round, spindled or stellate cells	Loose myxoid to focally collagenous	Vimentin, desmin, SMA^{1}, MSA^{2}, estrogen and progesterone receptor	36–72%	
Angiomyofibroblastoma	Well circumscribed	Abundant thin-walled blood vessels	Alternating hypercellular and hypocellular areas, perivascular condensations of spindled to epithelioid stromal cells	Collagenous to edematous with minimal mucin	Vimentin, desmin, CD34, estrogen and progesterone receptor	No recurrences reported, but rare cases of sarcomatous degeneration	
Superficial acral fibromyxoma	Pushing to infiltrative	Mild to moderately accentuated vasculature	Moderately cellular, spindle and stellate cells with a storiform to fascicular pattern, variable mast cells	Myxoid to collagenous	CD34, EMA^{3}, CD99	Recurrence rare and primarily for incompletely excised lesions	
Neurothekeoma (Nerve sheath myxoma)	Well circumscribed, multilobular	Hypovascular	Moderately cellular, spindled cells in fascicles and whorls	Nests of cells separated by collagenous bundles	S-100, EMA^{3}	47% if incompletely excised	

1. SMA, smooth muscle actin. 2. MSA, muscle-specific actin. 3. EMA, epithelial membrane antigen.

== Symptoms and signs ==
Symptoms associated with cardiac myxomas are typically due to the effect of the mass of the tumor obstructing the normal flow of blood within the chambers of the heart. Because pedunculated myxomas are somewhat mobile, symptoms may only occur when the patient is in a particular position.

Some symptoms of myxoma may be associated with the release of interleukin 6 (IL-6) by the myxoma. High levels of IL-6 may be associated with a higher risk of embolism of the myxoma.

Symptoms of a cardiac myxoma include:

- Dyspnea on exertion
- Paroxysmal nocturnal dyspnea
- Fever
- Weight loss (see cachexia)
- Lightheadedness or syncope (Loss of consciousness)
- Hemoptysis
- Sudden death
- Tachycardia or milder heartrate, i.e. 75–100 cycl/min

== Location ==
Animated image of an MRI of the heart, showing a large myxoma plunging to and fro from atrium to ventricle across the mitral valve.

=== Ocular myxoma ===
Myxoma is a rare, benign stromal tumor of mesenchymal origin often confused with other conjunctival stromal tumors. Conjunctival myxomas are thought to originate in Tenon's capsule and can masquerade as conjunctival lymphoma, lymphangioma, ocular surface squamous neoplasia (OSSN), or amelanotic melanoma.

- Atrial myxoma
- Cutaneous myxoma
- Odontogenic myxoma

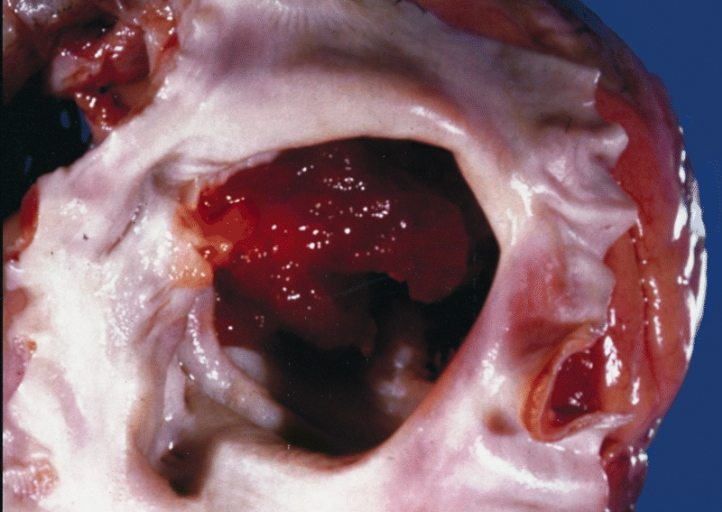
A myxoma. A gelatinous tumor can be seen attached by a narrow pedicle to the atrial septum. The myxoma has an irregular surface and nearly fills the left atrium.

=== Atrial myxoma ===
Myxomas are usually located in either the left or right atrium of the heart; about 86 percent occur in the left atrium.

Myxomas are typically pedunculated, with a stalk that is attached to the interatrial septum. The most common location for attachment of the stalk is the fossa ovalis region of the interatrial septum.

An atrial myxoma may create an extra heart sound, audible to auscultation just after S2. It is most seen on echocardiography, as a pedunculated mass that is heterogeneous in appearance. A left atrial myxoma will cause an increase in pulmonary capillary wedge pressure.

The differential diagnosis include other cardiac tumors such as lipomas and rhabdomyomas (and rarely teratomas). These other tumors of the heart are typically not pedunculated, however, and are more likely to infiltrate the muscle of the heart. Cardiac magnetic resonance imaging (MRI) can help non-invasively diagnose cardiac tumors. However, diagnosis usually requires examination of a tissue sample by a pathologist.

== Treatment ==
Myxomas are usually removed surgically. The surgeon removes the myxoma, along with at least 5 surrounding millimeters of atrial septum. The septum is then repaired, using material from the pericardium.

== Epidemiology ==
Cardiac myxomas predominantly appear in females in their 30s to 40s. Myxomas are the most common primary cardiac tumor affecting adults, accounting for one quarter to half of primary cardiac tumors seen in clinical practice.

== See also ==
- Myxoid tumor
- Cutaneous myxoma
- Carney complex
- Myxomatosis
- Primary tumors of the heart
- Myxomatous degeneration
