= Myxoid chondrosarcoma =

- Specialty: Oncology

Myxoid chondrosarcoma is a type of chondrosarcoma. It has been associated with a t(9;22) (q22;q12) EWS/CHN gene fusion.
