= Adipose tissue neoplasm =

- Specialty: Oncology

An adipose tissue neoplasm is a neoplasm derived from adipose tissue.

An example is lipoma.
