= Cutaneous myxoma =

- Other names: Superficial angiomyxoma
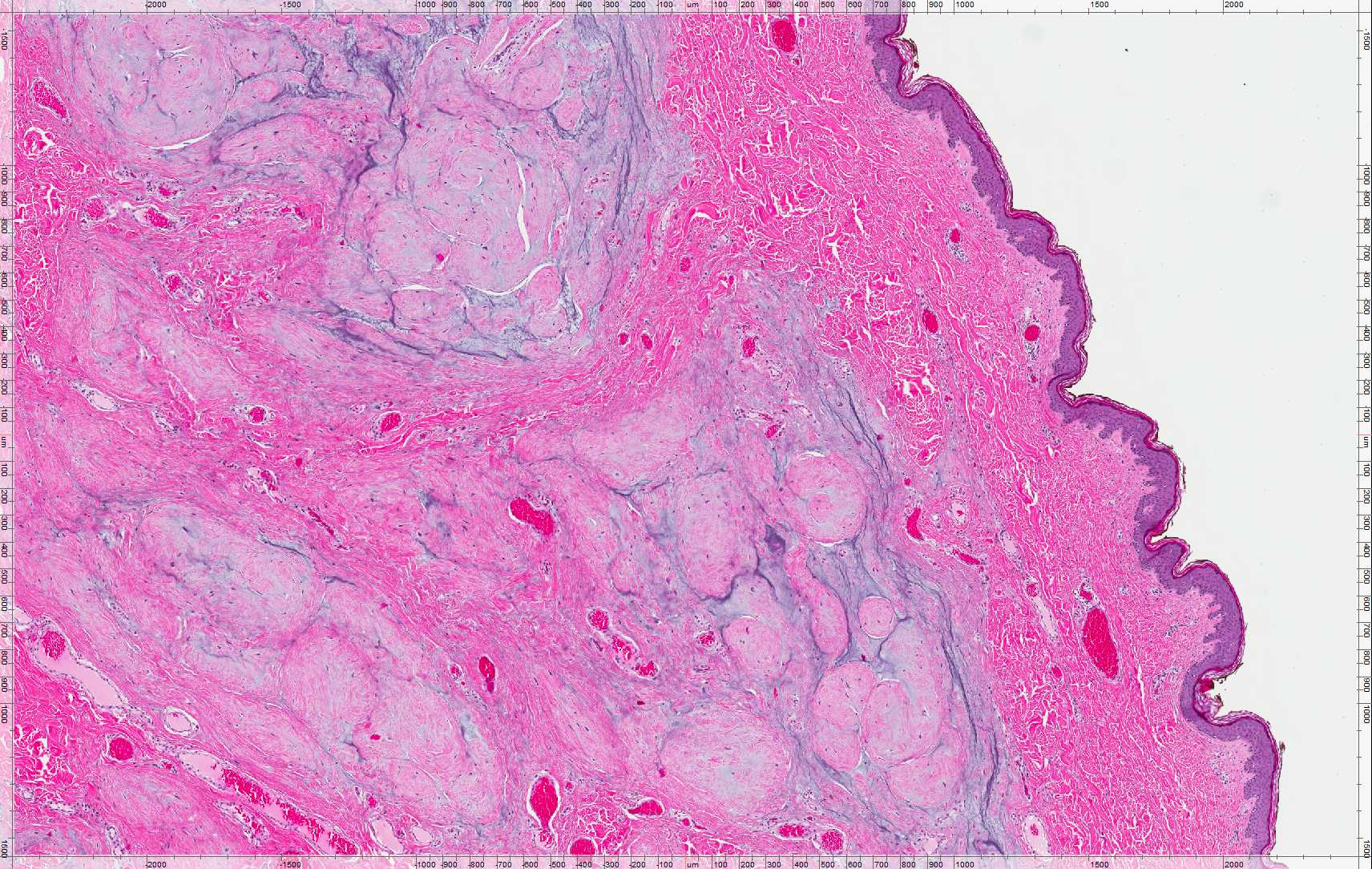
- Cutaneous myxoma
- Specialty: Oncology

A cutaneous myxoma, or superficial angiomyxoma, consists of a multilobulated myxoid mass containing stellate or spindled fibroblasts with pools of mucin forming cleft-like spaces. There is often a proliferation of blood vessels and an inflammatory infiltrate. Staining is positive for vimentin, negative for cytokeratin and desmin, and variable for CD34, Factor VIIIa, SMA, MSA and S-100.

Clinically, it may present as solitary or multiple flesh-colored nodules on the face, trunk, or extremities. It may occur as part of the Carney complex, and is sometimes the first sign. Local recurrence is common. Cutaneous myxoma is diagnosed based on histopathological features. The differential diagnosis for cutaneous myxoma include alopecia areata, verrucous hamartoma, cyst, fibroma, glioma, hemangioma, lipoma, scar, and nevus sebaceous. Treatment involves complete surgical excision.

== Signs and symptoms ==
Cutaneous myxoma appears as a little, slowly expanding dermal or subcutaneous lump that typically affects adults' heads and necks. Alopecic lesions have been reported, characterized by hair tufts overlaying the lesion or even hypertrichosis. Although usually painless, some people have reported experiencing discomfort or tenderness. A pedunculated lesion was reported.

== Causes ==
Cutaneous myxoma may occur in isolation or in association with syndromes such as nevi, atrial myxoma, myxoid neurofibromas, and ephelides (NAME) syndrome, Carney complex, and lentigines, atrial myxoma, mucocutaneous myxomas, and blue nevi (LAMB) syndrome.

== Diagnosis ==
A thin arborizing vascular network, a large myxoid stroma, mild to moderate cellularity with spindled to stellate cells with little or mild atypia, and the lack of nuclear pleomorphism or mitotic activity are among the histologic markers that are consistently present in cutaneous myxoma.

Alopecia areata, verrucous hamartoma, cyst, fibroma, glioma, hemangioma, lipoma, scar, and nevus sebaceous are only a few of the many conditions included in the extensive clinical differential diagnosis.

== Treatment ==
The main treatment for cutaneous myxoma is complete surgical excision.

== See also ==
- Myxoma
- Skin lesion
