= Lobulation =

Type of appearance of organs

Alveolar sacs of the lung, forming lobulations.

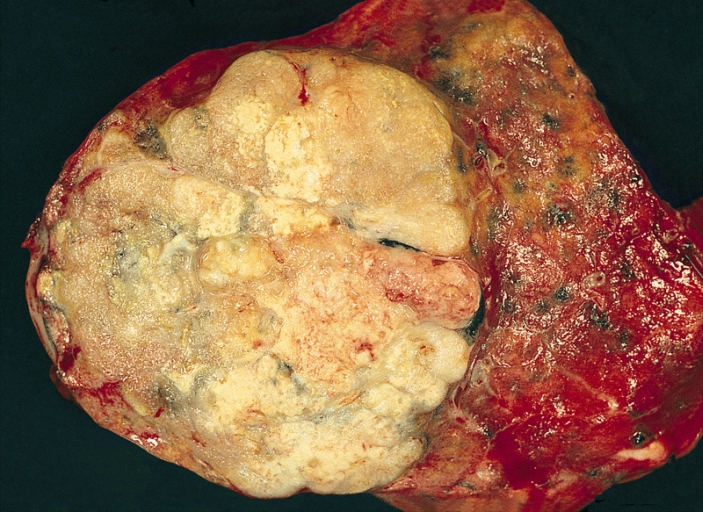
A "lobulated" adenocarcinoma of the lung.

A lobulation is an appearance resembling lobules.

For instance, the thyroid gland may become large and lobulated in Hashimoto's thyroiditis.

Fetal lobulation, also known as fetal lobation, of the kidney is evident on scanning. Fetal lobation is a normal stage in the development of the kidney. In the adult a normal anatomic variant is that of persistent fetal lobulation of the kidney that may be mistaken for a tumour.

== See also ==
- Lobation
