= Pseudocyst =

Cyst-like sac growth lacking an epithelial or endothelial cell lining

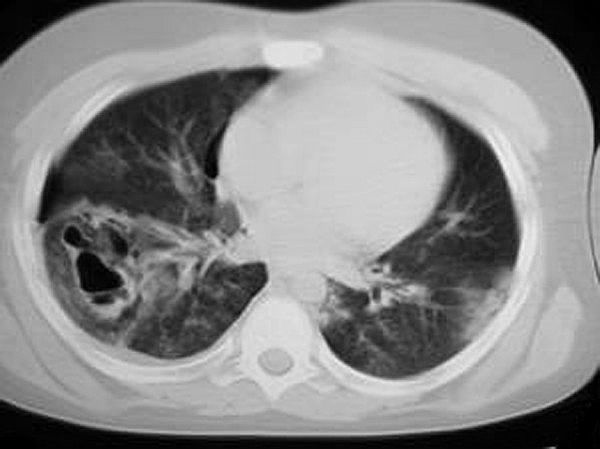
- A chest CT scan revealing pulmonary contusions, pneumothorax, and pseudocysts
- Specialty: Respirology

Pseudocysts are like cysts, but lack epithelial or endothelial cells. Initial management consists of general supportive care. Symptoms and complications caused by pseudocysts require surgery. Computed tomography (CT) scans are used for initial imaging of cysts, and endoscopic ultrasounds are used in differentiating between cysts and pseudocysts. Endoscopic drainage is a popular and effective method of treating pseudocysts.

This is not to be confused with the so-called "pseudocystic appearance", mainly radiographically, of other lesions, such as Stafne static bone cyst and aneurysmal bone cyst of the jaws.

== Signs and symptoms ==
Pseudocysts are often asymptomatic. Symptoms are more common in larger pseudocysts, though the size and time present usually are poor indicators of potential complications.

Pancreatic pseudocysts may cause abdominal pain, nausea and vomiting, a bloated feeling, and trouble eating or digesting food. They also may become infected, rupture, or block part of the intestine. Rarely, the infected pseudocyst causes jaundice or sepsis.

Mediastinal pseudocysts, a rare form of pancreatic pseudocysts in the abdomen, may cause dysphagia, dyspnea, airway obstruction, or cardiac tamponade.

Adrenal pseudocysts may cause abdominal pain, along with various gastrointestinal symptoms such as nausea, vomiting, and constipation.

== Cause ==
Pancreatic pseudocysts are often caused by acute or chronic pancreatitis. They may also be caused by trauma to the abdomen, with a higher frequency in children. Pseudocysts are more often present in chronic pancreatitis patients than acute pancreatitis patients. Also, if the pancreatitis is alcohol induced, there is a higher incidence of pseudocysts. These alcohol-related pseudocysts account for 59%-78% of all pancreatic pseudocysts. Actual pancreatic pseudocyst incidence is small, at around 1.6%-4.5%, or .5-1 per 100,000 adults per year.

Types of adrenal cysts include parasitic cysts, epithelial cysts, endothelial cysts, and pseudocysts. 56% of all adrenal cyst-like changes are pseudocysts, and only 7% of those pseudocysts are malignant or potentially malignant.

The cause of adrenal pseudocysts is unknown. A few theories exist, but it is believed that repeated episodes of trauma, infection, or bleeding may cause collagen formation leading to the formation of a fibrous lining.

Retinal pseudocysts may be related to geographic atrophy. A study found that 22% of eyes with geographic atrophy contained pseudocysts.

In American trypanosomiasis (Chagas’ disease), the parasite Trypanosoma cruzi forms pseudocysts, particularly within muscular and neurological tissue. Within these pseudocysts the parasites enter their amastigote stage, reproducing asexually, before rupturing from the pseudocyst and entering the bloodstream.

== Diagnosis ==
=== Description ===
A pseudocyst is a cystic lesion that may appear as a cyst on scans, but lacks epithelial or endothelial cells. An acute pancreatic pseudocyst is made of pancreatic fluids with a wall of fibrous tissue or granulation. Pseudocysts may form in a number of places, including the pancreas, abdomen, adrenal gland, and eye.

=== Pancreatic pseudocysts ===
The most common and effective method of diagnosing a pancreatic pseudocyst is with a CT scan. A pseudocyst generally appears as a fluid-filled mass. In some instances, other methods must be used to distinguish between a normal cyst and a pseudocyst. This is usually accomplished with endoscopic ultrasound or with fine needle aspiration.

Transabdominal ultrasound can be used to identify pseudocysts, which appear on the scan as echoic structures associated with distal acoustic enhancement. They tend to be round and enclosed in a smooth wall. Pseudocysts may appear more complex when young, hemorrhaged, or when complicated due to infection. The transabdominal ultrasound has a sensitivity rate in detection of pancreatic pseusocysts of 75%-90%, making it inferior to a CT scan, which has a rate of 90%-100%.

CT scans are more accurate, and provide more detail regarding the pseudocyst and its surroundings. The CT scan's weakness is its lack of differentiation between pseudocysts and cystic neoplasm. Also, the intravenous contrast given at the time of the CT scan may worsen kidney dysfunction.

MRI and MRCP are effective methods of detecting pseudocysts, but are not regularly used because CT scans offer most of the needed information. These scans do, however, provide better contrast, which allows for better characterization of fluid collections, depicting debris within the collections, and detection of bleeding.

Endoscopic ultrasound is generally used as a secondary test to further evaluate the cysts found in other tests, and is used when determining if a cyst is a pseudocyst or not.

=== Adrenal pseudocysts ===
Adrenal pseudocysts are found in much the same way as pancreatic pseudocysts, with CT scans. In addition, adrenalectomies are used to diagnose the lesion and sometimes relieve pain.

== Prevention ==
Because pseudocysts are closely related to other conditions, such as pancreatitis and alcohol use, the prevention of pseudocysts lies in the prevention of the main problem.

== Treatment ==
Not all cysts require treatment. Many pancreatic pseudocysts improve and disappear by themselves. If the cysts are small and are not causing symptoms, careful observation with periodic CT scans is often done. Pseudocysts that persist over many months or that cause symptoms require treatment.

Supportive medical care used to help small pseudocysts go away includes the use of intravenous fluids, analgesics, and antiemetics. Doctors often recommend a low-fat diet for those who can tolerate oral intake.

Surgery is usually required in the treatment of pseudocysts with symptoms or complications. There are three main methods for draining a pancreatic pseudocyst: endoscopic drainage, percutaneous catheter drainage, or open surgery. Endoscopic drainage tends to be the preferred method due to it being less invasive and having a high long-term success rate.

Percutaneous drainage involves the guidance of a CT scan or ultrasound. A drainage catheter is placed into the fluid cavity to drain the fluid, which is then collected over several weeks into an external collection system. The catheter is removed when the drainage becomes minimal. Once the catheter is removed, contrast is injected into the cyst cavity to determine the remaining size and to monitor progress. The success rate is around 50%, and the unsuccessful drainages are mostly caused by large ductal leaks or blockage of the main pancreatic duct. This method is not recommended when patients cannot manage a catheter at home or with patients whose cysts contain bloody or solid material.

Surgical drainage of a pseudocyst involves creating a pathway between the pseudocyst cavity and the stomach or small bowel. This method is generally only used if the patient cannot tolerate or failed percutaneous or endoscopic drainage. This method is more risky than the others.

Endoscopic drainage is becoming the preferred method of draining pseudocysts because it is less invasive, does not require external drain, and has a large long-term success rate. Drainage is usually achieved with a transpapillary approach with ERCP. Sometimes a direct drainage across the stomach or duodenal wall is used instead. The transpapillary approach is used when the pseudocyst is in communication with the main pancreatic duct, and is also successful in patients with pancreatic duct disruption. Transgastric or transduodenal approaches are used when the pseudocyst is next to the gastro-duodenal wall. Endoscopic ultrasound is the most commonly used test to gather the needed information about the pseudocyst for this method.

The endoscopic method depends on the presence of a bulge into the stomach or duodenum to determine the site for catheterization. Inherent risks include missing the pseudocyst, injuring nearby vessels, and inefficient placement of the catheter. In patients with chronic pseudocysts, this approach has a 90% success rate. Recurrence after drainage is around 4%, and the complication rate is below 16%.

To treat adrenal pseudocysts, an adrenalectomy or laproscopy may be used.
