= Neurothekeoma =

- Other names: Bizarre cutaneous neurofibroma, myxoma of nerve sheath, pacinian neurofibroma
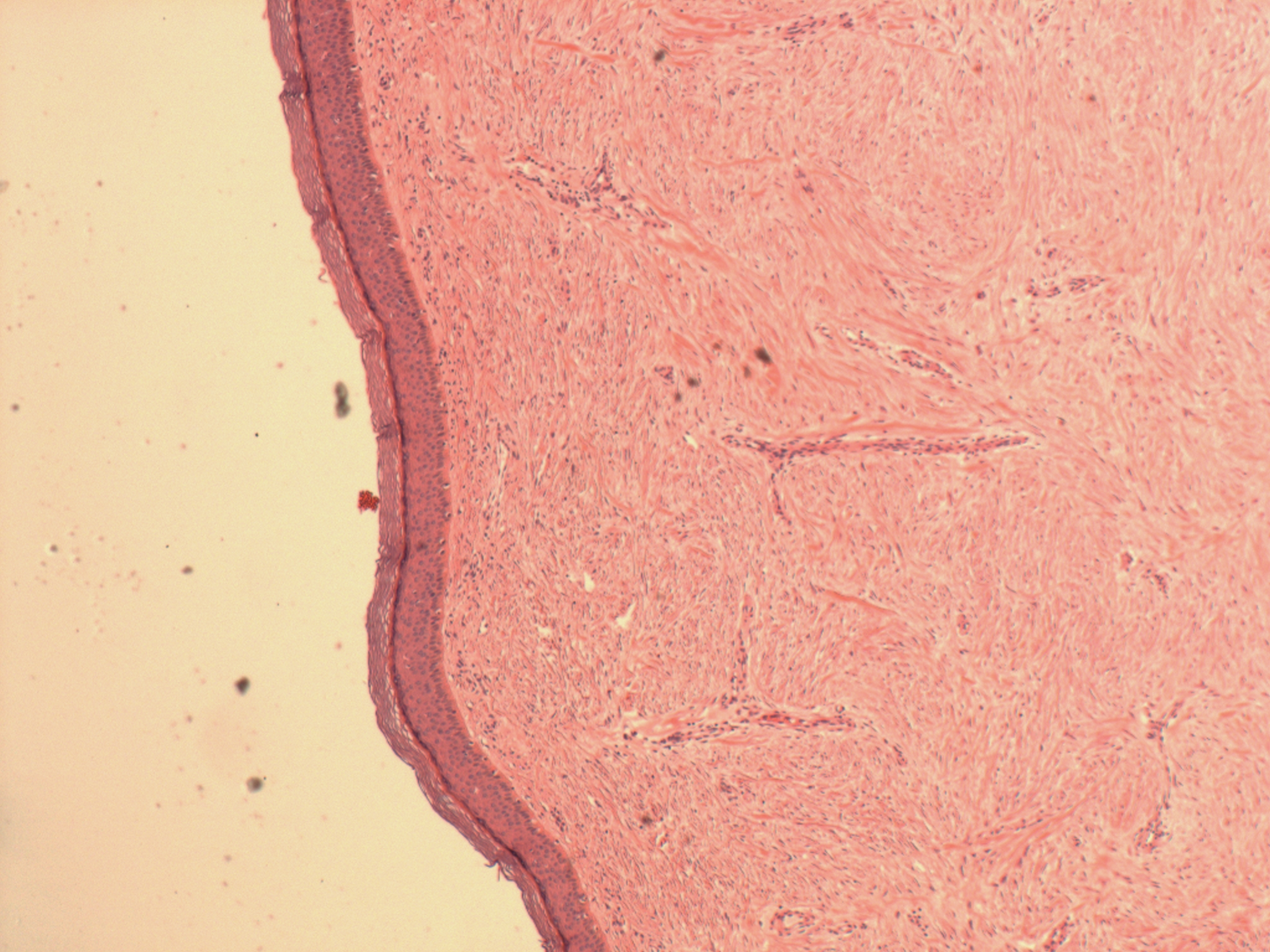
- Neurothekeoma histology slide
- Specialty: Oncology

A neurothekeoma is a type of rare benign cutaneous tumor that usually develops on the head and neck. They often occur in the second and early third decades of life and tend to afflict women more frequently than men. First described by Richard L Gallager and Elson B. Helwig, who proposed the term in order to reflect the presumed origin of the lesion from nerve sheath. Microscopically, the lesions described closely resembled the tumor, "nerve sheath myxoma (NSM)", an entity first described by Harkin and Reed. The latter had, through the years, been variously described as bizarre cutaneous neurofibroma, myxoma of nerve sheath, and pacinian neurofibroma.

Clinically, neurothekeomas present as a solitary nodule of the skin. The most common sites of occurrence are the head and neck and the extremities. The lesions range in size from about 0.5 cm to more than 3 cm. The average patient age is about 25 years, but neurothekeomas may occur at any age. Women are affected about twice often; the male to female ratio is approximately 1:2.

Microscopically, neurothekeoma consists of closely aggregated bundles or fascicles of spindle-shaped cells. The fascicles may or may not have a myxoid background.

Since the time of their first description, it has been reported that neurothekeomas are likely not of nerve sheath origin, as implied by the term. Consequently, neurothekeoma and nerve sheath myxoma are likely not related histogenetically, although they are similar in appearance and in behavior. Based mostly on the quantity of myxoid matrix present, neurothekeomas can have a variety of histologic characteristics, including myxoid, cellular, or mixed-type. The myxoid variety of neurothekeoma has inadvertently included nerve sheath myxoma due to similarity in clinical presentation and histology. However, it appears that the neurothekeoma that Barnhill and Mihm reported in 1990 is a separate and distinct entity from true nerve sheath myxoma. It has been proposed that neurothekeomas are derived from fibrohistiocytic cells rather than the peripheral nerve sheath. Despite having a different histologic appearance, neurothekeomas do not respond with the S100 protein while nerve sheath myxoma do (myxoid, mixed, or cellular).

== Difference from nerve sheath myxoma ==
A rare neuro-ectodermal tumor known as a benign nerve sheath myxoma was originally identified in 1969. In contrast, a cellular variation known as neurothekeoma was characterized in 1980 by Gallager and Helwig. Later on, it was common to use both neurothekeoma and nerve sheath myxoma interchangeably. In 2011, Sheth et al. used microarray analysis to distinguish between neurothekeoma and nerve sheath myxoma based on the genetic expression of the cells. Nerve sheath myxoma is more frequent among young people without gender preference. Between 30 and 40 years of age is when the incidence peaks. The head and neck are rarely affected by the tumor, which is more usually seen in the upper limb. Young women are twice as likely as males to get neurothekeoma, and it usually affects the head and neck rather than the hands. While neurothekeoma can afflict females from infancy to old age with a peak incidence in the twenties, nerve sheath myxoma has a peak incidence in the fourth decade.

== Clinical features ==
Lesions are often a singular subcutaneous dome-shaped papule or nodule measuring less than 2 cm and may be skin-colored, pink to tan, or red to brown. Most lesions are asymptomatic although some may present with pain upon pressure. The lesions tend to grow slowly and are usually superficially located, with rare, deeper involvement of subcutaneous fat or skeletal muscle. The head and neck are the most common locations, but neurothekeomas may also be seen on the shoulder or upper extremities, while involvement of the mucosa is rare.

== Treatment ==
Surgical excision is the treatment of choice. There have been reports of neurothekeomas exhibiting atypical features, raising concern for their potential for aggression even though the majority of these tumors are small (less than 1 cm), have relatively bland histology, little to no cytologic atypia, and only minimal extension into surrounding fat or skeletal muscle. Clinical size more than 1 cm, pleomorphism and enhanced mitotic activity in the cytology, infiltration into skeletal muscle or subcutaneous fat, and vascular invasion are reported as unusual characteristics. Despite the presence of unusual characteristics, documented recurrence rates after total surgical excision are very low.

== See also ==
- List of cutaneous conditions
- List of histologic stains that aid in diagnosis of cutaneous conditions
- Myxoid tumor
