= Vimentin =

Type III intermediate filament protein

VIM
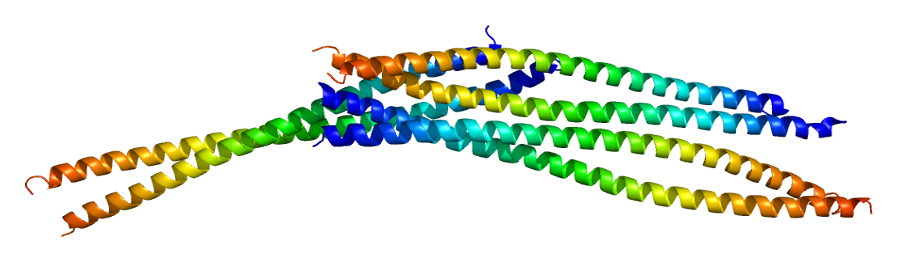

Identifiers
- Aliases: VIM, CTRCT30, HEL113, vimentin
- External IDs: OMIM: 193060; MGI: 98932; GeneCards: VIM
Available structures
PDB	Ortholog search: PDBe RCSB
PDB	List of PDB id codes 1GK4, 1GK6, 1GK7, 3G1E, 3KLT, 3S4R, 3SSU, 3SWK, 3TRT, 3UF1, 4MCY, 4MCZ, 4MD0, 4MD5, 4MDJ, 4YPC, 4YV3

Gene location (Human)
Chr.	Chromosome 10 (human)
Band	10p13	Start	17,228,241 bp
Band	10p13	End	17,237,593 bp

Gene location (Mouse)
Chr.	Chromosome 2 (mouse)
Band	2 A1|2 10.04 cM	Start	13,578,738 bp
Band	2 A1|2 10.04 cM	End	13,587,637 bp
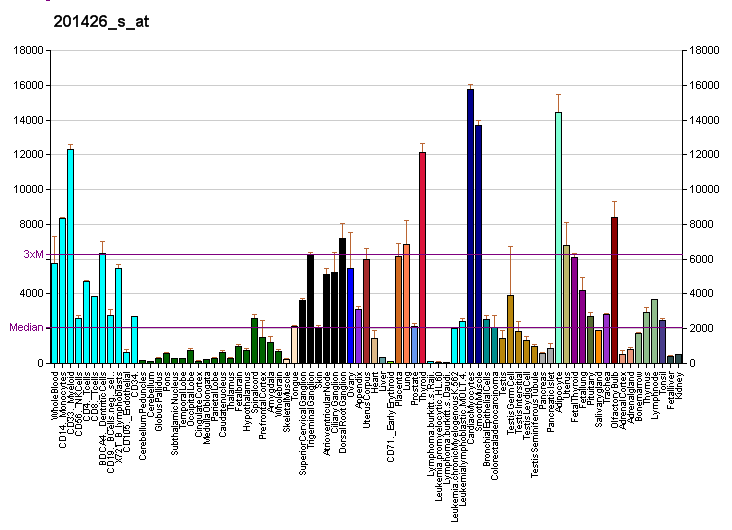
RNA expression pattern
Bgee	Human / Mouse (ortholog); Top expressed in: ventricular zone; Descending thoracic aorta; right coronary artery; synovial membrane; spinal ganglia; popliteal artery; tibial arteries; decidua; ascending aorta; tibial nerve / Top expressed in: endothelial cell of lymphatic vessel; left lung lobe; dermis; Gonadal ridge; external carotid artery; tunica media of zone of aorta; stroma of bone marrow; internal carotid artery; ascending aorta; semi-lunar valve; More reference expression data
BioGPS	More reference expression data
Gene ontology
Molecular function	scaffold protein binding; structural molecule activity; structural constituent of cytoskeleton; protein C-terminus binding; protein binding; structural constituent of eye lens; identical protein binding; double-stranded RNA binding; keratin filament binding; protein domain specific binding
Cellular component	cytoplasm; cytosol; cell projection; focal adhesion; plasma membrane; peroxisome; cell leading edge; neuron projection; extracellular exosome; cytoskeleton; intermediate filament; extracellular matrix; nucleus; polysome; nuclear matrix; phagocytic vesicle; ribonucleoprotein complex
Biological process	intermediate filament organization; negative regulation of neuron projection development; SMAD protein signal transduction; astrocyte development; intermediate filament-based process; positive regulation of gene expression; muscle filament sliding; Bergmann glial cell differentiation; viral process; lens fiber cell development; cytokine-mediated signaling pathway; positive regulation of collagen biosynthetic process; regulation of mRNA stability; positive regulation of translation; cellular response to lipopolysaccharide; cellular response to muramyl dipeptide; cellular response to interferon-gamma
Sources:Amigo / QuickGO
Orthologs
Databases	NCBI: entry; OMA: entry
Species	Human	Mouse
Entrez	7431	22352
Ensembl	ENSG00000026025	ENSMUSG00000026728
UniProt	P08670	P20152
RefSeq (mRNA)	NM_003380	NM_011701
RefSeq (protein)	NP_003371	NP_035831
Location (UCSC)	Chr 10: 17.23 – 17.24 Mb	Chr 2: 13.58 – 13.59 Mb
PubMed search
- Wikidata
View/Edit Human	View/Edit Mouse

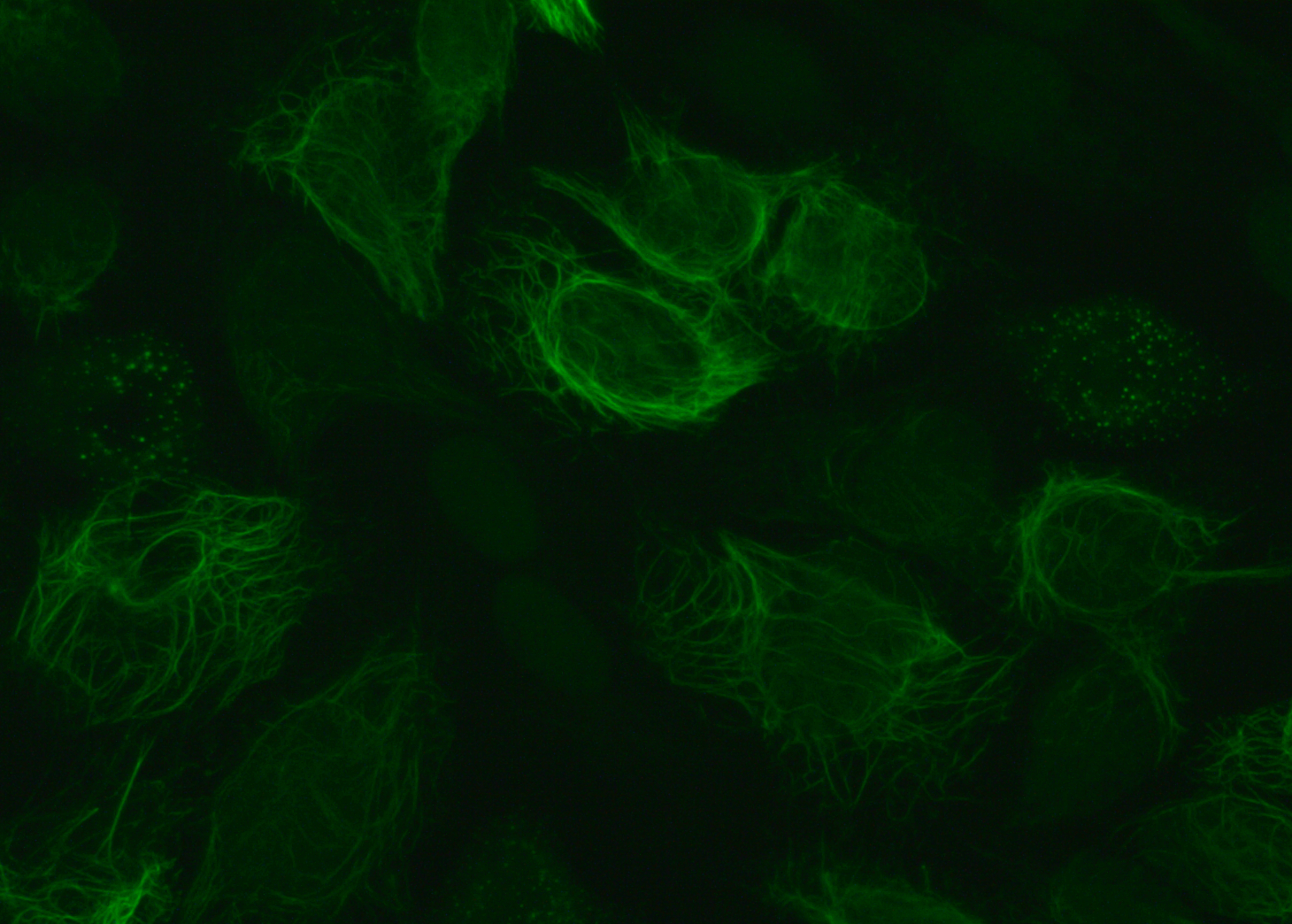
Immunofluorescence staining pattern of vimentin antibodies. Produced by incubating vimentin primary antibodies and FITC labelled secondary antibodies with HEp-20-10 cells.

Vimentin is a structural protein that in humans is encoded by the VIM gene. Its name comes from the Latin vimentum, meaning an osier, withy (array of flexible rods).

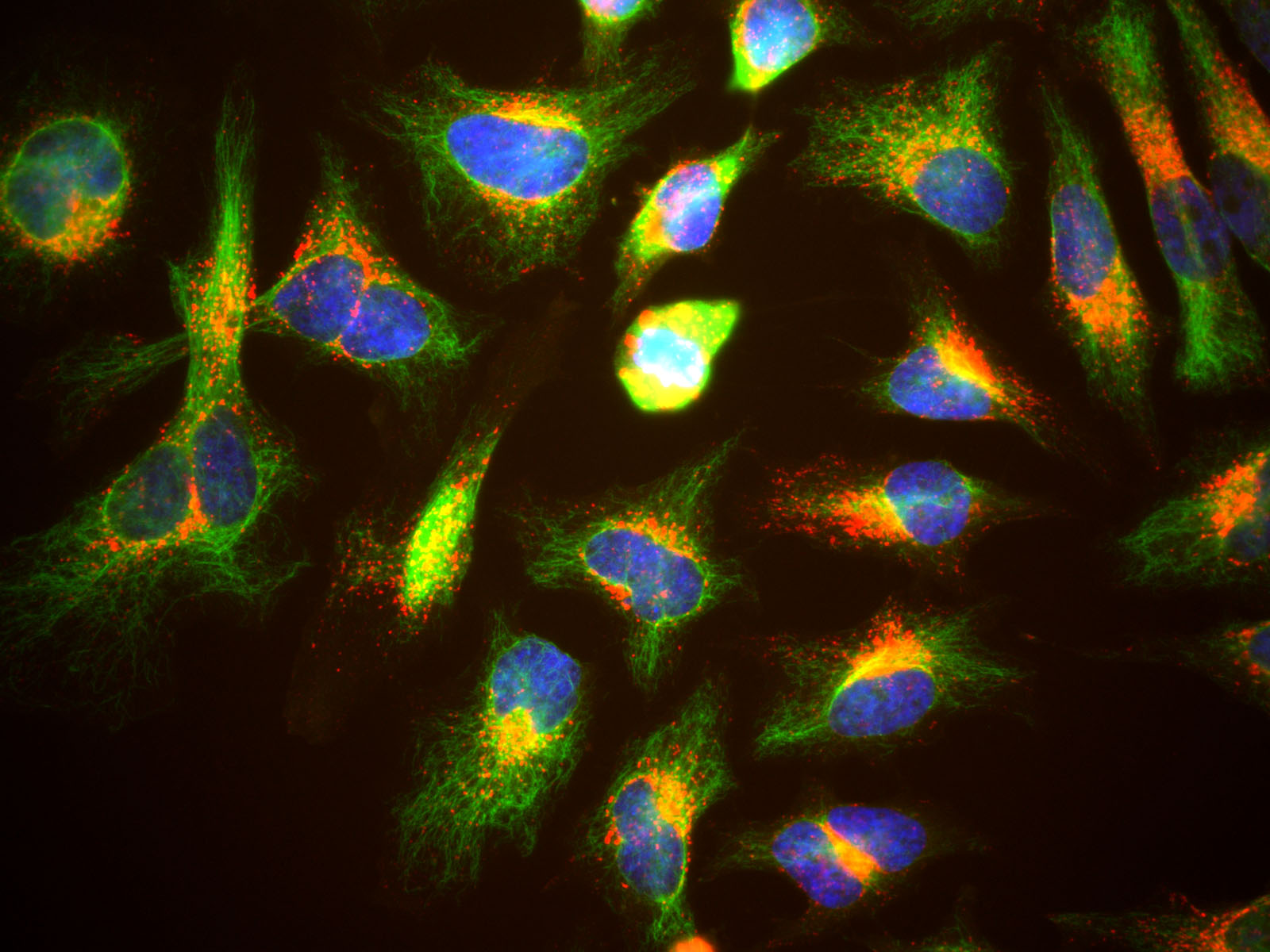
Immunofluorescence staining of HeLa Cells with antibody to reveal vimentin containing intermediate filaments in green and antibody to LAMP1 to reveal lysosomes in red. Nuclear DNA is seen in blue. Antibodies and image courtesy EnCor Biotechnology Inc.

Vimentin is a type III intermediate filament (IF) protein that is expressed in mesenchymal cells. IF proteins are found in all animal cells as well as bacteria. Intermediate filaments, along with tubulin-based microtubules and actin-based microfilaments, comprise the cytoskeleton. All IF proteins are expressed in a highly developmentally-regulated fashion; vimentin is the major cytoskeletal component of mesenchymal cells. Because of this, vimentin is often used as a marker of mesenchymally-derived cells or cells undergoing an epithelial-to-mesenchymal transition (EMT) during both normal development and metastatic progression.

== Structure ==
The assembly of the fibrous vimentin filament that forms the cytoskeleton follows a gradual sequence. The vimentin monomer has a central α-helical domain, capped on each end by non-helical amino (head) and carboxyl (tail) domains. Two monomers are likely co-translationally expressed in a way that facilitates their interaction forming a coiled-coil dimer, which is the basic subunit of vimentin assembly. A pair of coiled-coil dimers connect in an antiparallel fashion to form a tetramer. Eight tetramers join to form what is known as the unit-length filament (ULF), ULFs then stick to each other and elongate followed by compaction to form the fibrous proteins.

The α-helical sequences contain a pattern of hydrophobic amino acids that contribute to forming a "hydrophobic seal" on the surface of the helix. In addition, there is a periodic distribution of acidic and basic amino acids that seems to play an important role in stabilizing coiled-coil dimers. The spacing of the charged residues is optimal for ionic salt bridges, which allows for the stabilization of the α-helix structure. While this type of stabilization is intuitive for intrachain interactions, rather than interchain interactions, scientists have proposed that perhaps the switch from intrachain salt bridges formed by acidic and basic residues to the interchain ionic associations contributes to the assembly of the filament.

== Function ==
Vimentin plays a significant role in supporting and anchoring the position of the organelles in the cytosol. Vimentin is attached to the nucleus, endoplasmic reticulum, and mitochondria, either laterally or terminally.

The dynamic nature of vimentin is important when offering flexibility to the cell. Scientists found that vimentin provided cells with a resilience absent from the microtubule or actin filament networks, when under mechanical stress in vivo. Therefore, in general, it is accepted that vimentin is the cytoskeletal component responsible for maintaining cell integrity. (It was found that cells without vimentin are extremely delicate when disturbed with a micropuncture). Transgenic mice that lack vimentin appeared normal and did not show functional differences. It is possible that the microtubule network may have compensated for the absence of the intermediate network. This result supports an intimate interaction between microtubules and vimentin. Moreover, when microtubule depolymerizers were present, vimentin reorganization occurred, once again implying a relationship between the two systems. On the other hand, wounded mice that lack the vimentin gene heal slower than their wild type counterparts.

In essence, vimentin is responsible for maintaining cell shape, integrity of the cytoplasm, and stabilizing cytoskeletal interactions. Vimentin has been shown to eliminate toxic proteins in JUNQ and IPOD inclusion bodies in asymmetric division of mammalian cell lines.

Also, vimentin is found to control the transport of low-density lipoprotein, LDL, -derived cholesterol from a lysosome to the site of esterification. With the blocking of transport of LDL-derived cholesterol inside the cell, cells were found to store a much lower percentage of the lipoprotein than normal cells with vimentin. This dependence seems to be the first process of a biochemical function in any cell that depends on a cellular intermediate filament network. This type of dependence has ramifications on the adrenal cells, which rely on cholesteryl esters derived from LDL.

Vimentin plays a role in aggresome formation, where it forms a cage surrounding a core of aggregated protein.

In addition to its conventional intracellular localisation, vimentin can be found extracellularly. Vimentin can be expressed as a cell surface protein and have suggested roles in immune reactions. It can also be released in phosphorylated forms to the extracellular space by activated macrophages, astrocytes are also known to release vimentin.

== Clinical significance ==
It has been used as a sarcoma tumor marker to identify mesenchyme, though its specificity as a bio marker has been disputed. Vimentin is present in spindle cell squameous cell carcinoma.

Methylation of the vimentin gene has been established as a biomarker of colon cancer and this is being utilized in the development of fecal tests for colon cancer. Statistically significant levels of vimentin gene methylation have also been observed in certain upper gastrointestinal pathologies such as Barrett's esophagus, esophageal adenocarcinoma, and intestinal type gastric cancer. High levels of DNA methylation in the promoter region have also been associated with markedly decreased survival in hormone positive breast cancers. Downregulation of vimentin was identified in cystic variant of papillary thyroid carcinoma using a proteomic approach. See also Anti-citrullinated protein antibody for its use in diagnosis of rheumatoid arthritis. Vimentin has also been found to be an attachment factor for SARS-CoV-2.

== Interactions ==
Vimentin has been shown to interact with:

- DSP
- MEN1
- MYST2
- PKN1
- PRKCI
- PLEC
- SPTAN1
- UPP1
- YWHAZ

The 3' UTR of Vimentin mRNA has been found to bind a 46kDa protein.
