= DYRK (disambiguation) =

DYRK is an FM radio station in Cebu City, Philippines known as 96.3 WRocK. It may also refer to:

== Science and technology ==
- DYRK1A, protein-coding gene in humans
- DYRK1B, protein-coding gene in humans
- DYRK2, protein-coding gene in humans
- DYRK3, protein-coding gene in humans

== Television and film ==
- Dyrk jorden!, a 1936 film
- Dyrk Magz, DC Comics character also known as Magno
