= CBL-514 =

Clinical data
- Other names: CBL514; CBL-514D; CBL514D
- Routes of administration: Subcutaneous injection
- Drug class: DYRK1B inhibitor

CBL-514 is a DYRK1B inhibitor and "lipolysis drug" which is under development for the treatment of subcutaneous fat disorders such as Dercum's disease (painful lipomas), adiposis dolorosa, cellulite, and obesity. It is taken by subcutaneous injection.

The drug works by inhibiting the cell survival kinase DYRK1B, which in turn upregulates the apoptosis mediators caspase 3 and Bax/Bcl-2 to dose-dependently and selectively promote adipocyte apoptosis and lipolysis in vitro and in vivo. CBL-514 has been found to reduce both subcutaneous and visceral fat in humans. It is said to be a novel first-in-class drug.

CBL-514 is under development by Caliway Biopharmaceuticals. As of August 2026, it is in phase 3 clinical trials for subcutaneous fat disorders and is in phase 2 trials for adiposis dolorosa, cellulite, and obesity. The chemical structure of CBL-514 does not yet appear to have been released. However, the drug has been described as being a stabilized combination of resveratrol and curcumin.
