= Dual-specificity kinase =

Enzyme

Identifiers
- EC no.: 2.7.12.1
- CAS no.: 134549-83-0

Databases
- IntEnz: IntEnz view
- BRENDA: BRENDA entry
- ExPASy: NiceZyme view
- KEGG: KEGG entry
- MetaCyc: metabolic pathway
- PRIAM: profile
- PDB structures: RCSB PDB PDBe PDBsum
Search
- PMC: articles
- PubMed: articles
- NCBI: proteins

In biochemistry, a dual-specificity kinase (EC 2.7.12.1) is a kinase that can act as both tyrosine kinase and serine/threonine kinase.

MEKs, involved in MAP pathways, are principal examples of dual-specificity kinases. Other common examples include:

- ADK1 (Arabidopsis dual specificity kinase 1)
- CLK1, CLK2, CLK3, CLK4
- DSTYK
- DYRK1A, DYRK1B, DYRK2, DYRK3, DYRK4
- Mps1p
- TESK1, TESK2
- TTK

The systematic name of this enzyme class is ATP:protein phosphotransferase (Ser/Thr- and Tyr-phosphorylating).
