= Louise Bryant =

American activist and journalist (1885–1936)

- Bryant c. 1917
- Born: Anna Louise Mohan; December 5, 1885; San Francisco, California, US
- Died: January 6, 1936 (aged 50); Sèvres, France
- Resting place: Cimetière des Gonards
- Education: University of Oregon
- Occupation: Journalist
- Spouses: Paul Trullinger (m. 1909; div. 1916); John Reed (m. 1916; died 1920); William Christian Bullitt, Jr. (m. 1924; div. 1930)
- Children: Anne Moen Bullitt

Louise Bryant (December 5, 1885 – January 6, 1936) was an American feminist, political activist, and journalist best known for her sympathetic coverage of Russia and the Bolsheviks during the Russian Revolution of November 1917.

Born Anna Louise Mohan, she began as a young girl to use the last name of her stepfather, Sheridan Bryant, in preference to that of her father. She grew up in rural Nevada and attended the University of Nevada in Reno and the University of Oregon in Eugene, graduating with a degree in history in 1909. Pursuing a career in journalism, she became society editor of the Spectator and freelanced for The Oregonian, newspapers in Portland, Oregon. During her years in that city (1909–1915), she became active in the women's suffrage movement. Leaving her first husband in 1915 to follow fellow journalist John Reed (whom she married in 1916) to Greenwich Village, she formed friendships with leading feminists of the day, some of whom she met through Reed's associates at publications such as The Masses; at meetings of a women's group, Heterodoxy; and through work with the Provincetown Players. During a National Woman's Party suffrage-rally in Washington, D.C., in 1919 she was arrested and spent three days in jail. Both she and Reed took lovers outside their marriage; during her Greenwich Village years (1916–1920), these included the playwright Eugene O'Neill and the painter Andrew Dasburg.

In her 1917 coverage of the Russian Revolution, Bryant wrote about Russian leaders such as Catherine Breshkovsky, Maria Spiridonova, Alexander Kerensky, Vladimir Lenin, and Leon Trotsky. Her news stories, distributed by Hearst during and after her trips to Petrograd and Moscow, appeared in newspapers across the United States and Canada in the years immediately following World War I. A collection of articles from her first trip was published in 1918 as Six Red Months in Russia. Over the next year, she defended the revolution in testimony before the Overman Committee, a Senate subcommittee established in September 1918 to investigate foreign influence in the United States. Later in 1919, she undertook a nationwide speaking tour to encourage public support for the Bolsheviks and to denounce armed U.S. intervention in Russia.

After Reed's death from typhus in 1920, Bryant continued to write for Hearst about Russia, as well as Turkey, Hungary, Greece, Italy, and other countries in Europe and the Middle East. Some articles from this period were collected in 1923 under the title Mirrors of Moscow. Later that year, she married William C. Bullitt, Jr., with whom she had her only child, Anne, the following year. Diagnosed in her later years from the rare and painful disorder adiposis dolorosa, Bryant did little writing or publishing in her last decade, and drank heavily. Bullitt, winning sole custody of Anne, divorced Bryant in 1930. Bryant died in Paris in 1936 and was buried in Versailles. In 1998, a group from Portland restored her grave, which had become neglected.

== Early life ==
Her father, Hugh Mohan, was born in Pennsylvania to Irish immigrant parents from county Fermanagh. He became a journalist and stump speaker involved in labor issues and Democratic Party politics. Moving to San Francisco, he continued to write for newspapers, and in 1880 he married Louisa Flick, who grew up on the ranch of her stepfather, James Say, near Lake Humboldt in Nevada. The Mohans had two children, Barbara (1880) and Louis (1882), before the birth of Anna Louise. Later in 1885, the family moved to Reno, where Mohan continued his journalistic career but drank heavily. One day he departed and never returned to his wife and children. Louise's mother divorced him in 1889 and married Sheridan Bryant, a freight conductor on the Southern Pacific railway. The couple had two children, Floyd (1894) and William (1896). Although the family lived in Wadsworth, Nevada, Louise accepted an invitation from James Say to live at his ranch. She remained there for three or four years, returning to Wadsworth at her mother's insistence at the age of 12. Bryant adopted her stepfather's last name, but never changed it legally from Mohan.

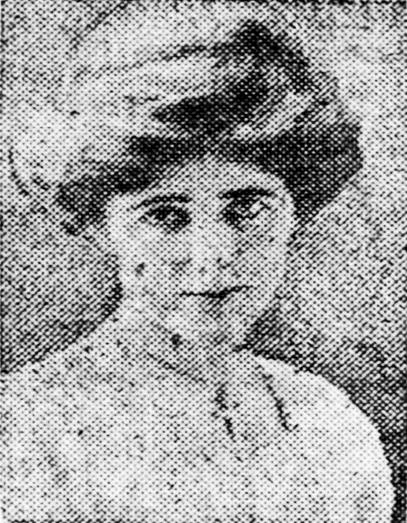
Bryant in a sorority photo at the University of Oregon in 1909

Attending high school in Wadsworth and Reno and college at Nevada State University (now known as the University of Nevada, Reno), Bryant developed interests in journalism, debate, illustration, social life, dancing, and basketball. She edited the "Young Ladies Edition" of the Student Record in 1905, wrote a short story, "The Way of a Flirt", for a literary magazine, Chuckwalla, and contributed sketches to it and another publication, Artemisia. Depressed after the death of her step-grandfather in 1906, Bryant left school for a job in Jolon, California, where for a few months she boarded at a cattle ranch and taught children, mostly young Mexicans. That summer she moved to Eugene, Oregon, where her brother Louis worked for the Southern Pacific.

After learning that she could transfer her college credits from Nevada, she enrolled at the University of Oregon, in Eugene. Popular at the school, which then had a total student enrollment of less than 500, she helped start a small sorority, Zeta Iota Phi (a chapter of Chi Omega), and served as its first president. During her time in Eugene, she produced poems and pen-and-ink sketches for the Oregon Monthly. In a small city steeped in "puritan moralism", she was the first to wear rouge on campus; she had multiple boyfriends, and she wore clothes that Miriam Van Waters, the editor of the Oregon Monthly, and Luella Clay Carson, the dean of women, considered improper. Taking off the spring semester of 1908 to teach in a one-room schoolhouse on Stuart Island, one of the San Juan Islands near the U.S. border with Canada, she returned to Eugene to finish her bachelor's degree in history, graduating in early 1909. Her senior thesis was on the Modoc Indian Wars.

== Portland ==
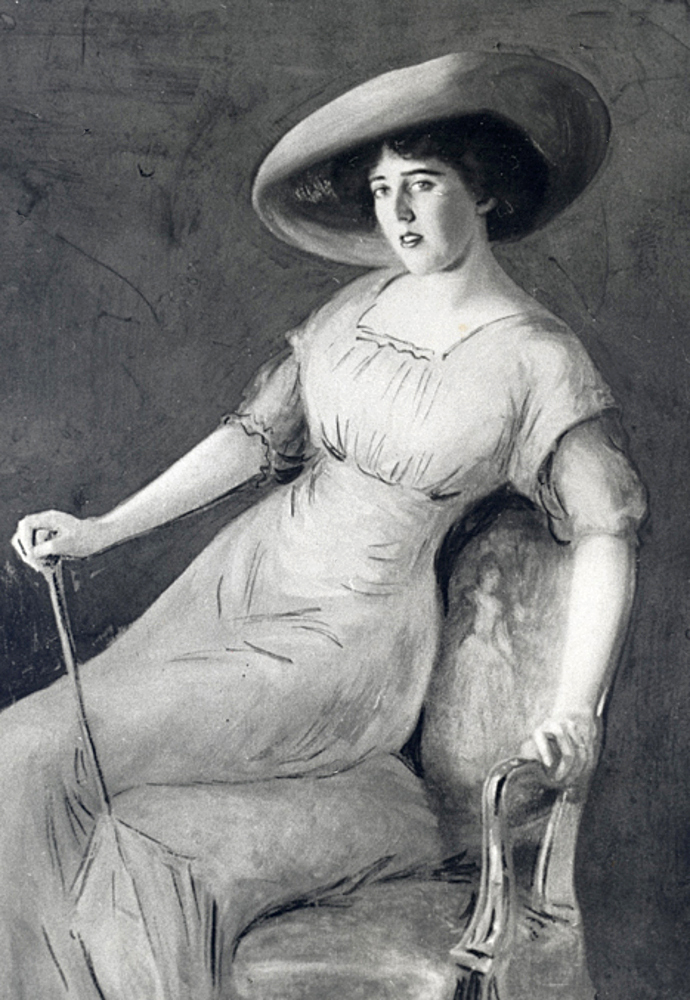
1913 oil portrait of Bryant by John Trullinger, cousin of her first husband

In the spring of 1909, Bryant moved to Portland, Oregon, first sharing a downtown apartment with one of her college friends, Clara Wold, then renting her own apartment in the same building. Among her jobs, she designed a stained-glass window for the Povey Brothers, worked as a freelance reporter for The Oregonian, and became an illustrator and society editor for the Portland Spectator, a weekly news magazine. Meanwhile, she formed friendships with people—such as Cas Baer, drama editor for The Oregonian—who were interested in journalism and the arts. In late 1909, she met and married Paul Trullinger, a dentist who lived on a houseboat on the Willamette River, collected art, and liked drinking parties that sometimes included invitations to his office to inhale ether.

Bryant, who retained her maiden name and her downtown apartment after her marriage to Trullinger, bridled at doing housework and yearned for professional advancement. Drawn toward politics and the women's suffrage movement by her friend Sara Bard Field, she joined the Oregon branch of the College Equal Suffrage League in 1912. She and Field gave pro-suffrage speeches in smaller Oregon cities, and Bryant rode on the suffrage float in Portland's annual Flag Day parade. Led by Abigail Scott Duniway, women achieved suffrage in Oregon later that year.

Bryant became familiar with the socialist journal The Masses through Portland resident and lawyer C. E. S. Wood, who eventually married Field and who often contributed to the magazine. Enthusiastic about its contents, particularly articles by Portland native John Reed, Bryant began raising subscriptions for it. Emma Goldman, a well-known anarchist whom Wood had defended in court, gave a speech in Reed's honor at the Industrial Workers of the World (IWW) hall in Portland. She and other political activists, such as Alexander Berkman, were among guests entertained by Bryant and her husband. In 1914, Reed, a Harvard graduate and established writer who by then lived in Greenwich Village, came home for a visit, during which he spoke at the University Club of Portland against the class system. Exactly how or when or how often Bryant and Reed met is uncertain, but they probably met each other on December 15, 1915, before they were introduced by mutual friends Carl and Helen Walters. Near Christmas 1915 when Reed again came home to visit his widowed mother, the young couple announced their love at a dinner party. Reed returned to Greenwich Village on December 28, and Bryant, abandoning her marriage, followed him three days later. Trullinger filed for divorce, which was granted in July 1916, on grounds of desertion.

== Greenwich Village and Cape Cod ==
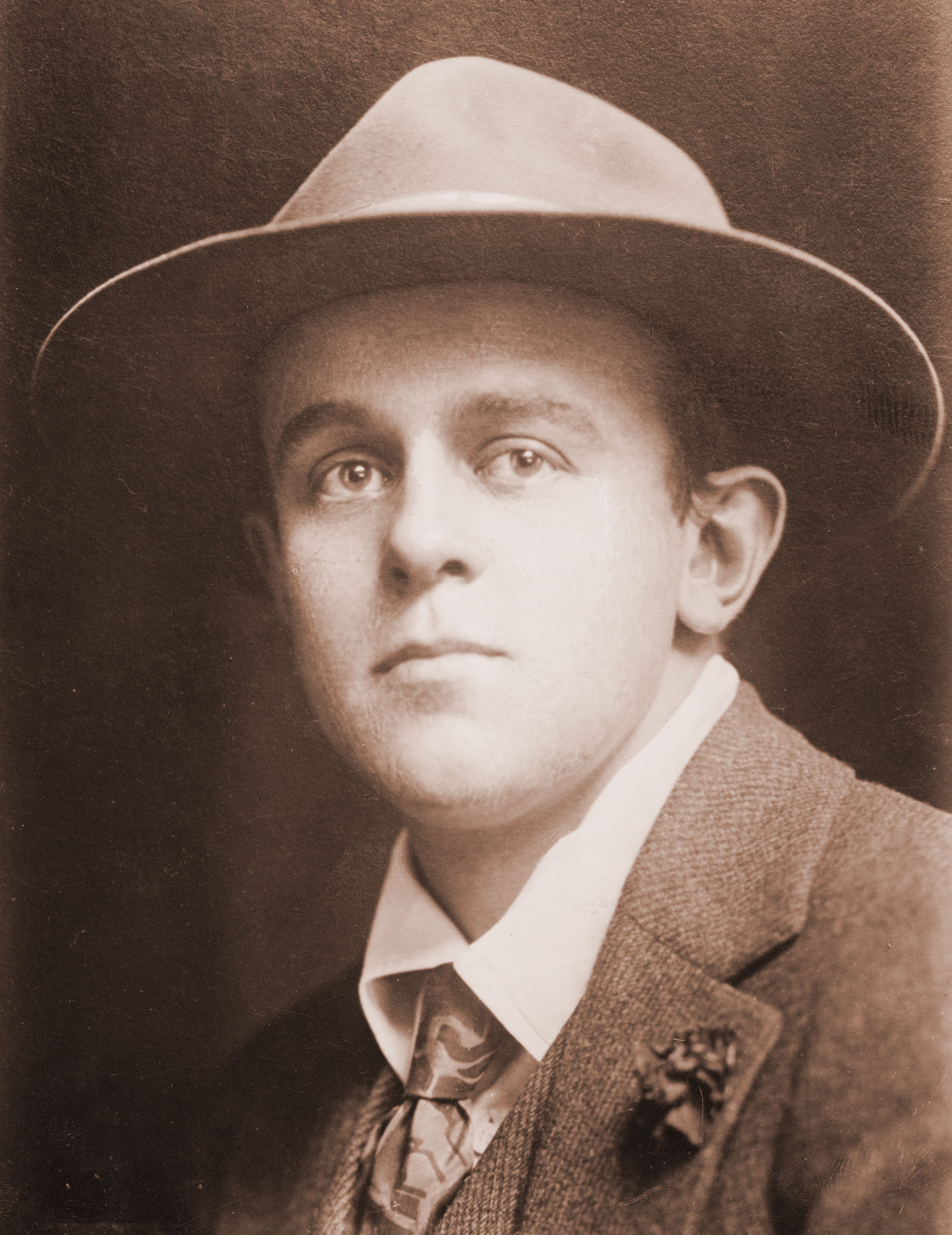
John Reed, c. 1910–1915

Reed had rented a room for Bryant near his apartment at 43 Washington Square. Their unmarried co-habitation caused little curiosity among Reed's friends in the Village, many of whom rejected marriage and other middle-class norms. Unified by an "air of intellectual freedom, moral laissez-faire and camaraderie", most were involved in literary, artistic, or political pursuits in a Bohemian neighborhood that in some ways resembled the Left Bank of Paris. While visiting New York, Field took Bryant to a meeting of Heterodoxy, a women's group that included feminist Charlotte Perkins Gilman, labor journalist Mary Heaton Vorse, political activist Crystal Eastman, actress Ida Rauh, writers Zona Gale and Mary Austin, and many others. Among Bryant's new friends were feminists Inez Milholland, Inez Gillmore, and Doris Stevens. Other notables circulating in the Village included Emma Goldman, playwright Eugene O'Neill, and one of Reed's former lovers, arts patron Mabel Dodge.

At Number 43, Bryant and Reed pursued their journalistic endeavors in separate work rooms. Four months after leaving Oregon, Bryant broke into print in New York with an article about two Portland judges, one of whom had dismissed a case brought against Goldman for distributing birth-control information. It was published as "Two Judges" in the April 1916 issue of The Masses, edited by Max Eastman, Crystal Eastman's brother. Meanwhile, Reed, who had reported on the 1913 Paterson silk strike, Pancho Villa in 1913–1914, and the ongoing war (World War I) in Europe, went on assignment for Collier's to interview William Jennings Bryan in Florida.

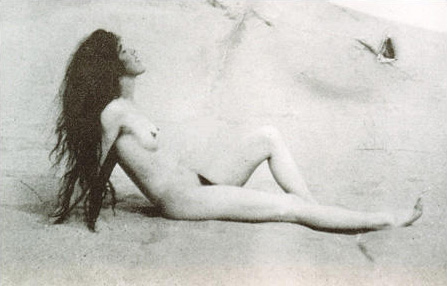
Bryant sunbathing in Provincetown, 1916

Later that spring Bryant and Reed heeded Vorse's call to spend the warm season in Provincetown, Massachusetts, at the tip of Cape Cod, and to take part in the communal theater productions of the Provincetown Players. Others from the Village went as well and joined the group, organized in 1915 by George Cram Cook and his wife, Susan Glaspell, who hoped to produce plays that were both political and artistic. Among the works the group staged in 1916 were Bryant's The Game, in which characters named Life and Death play dice for the lives of Youth (a poet) and Girl (a dancer). It appeared on the same bill as Not Smart by Wilbur Steele and Bound East for Cardiff by O'Neill.

During the summer, Reed left Cape Cod to cover the Progressive Party convention in Chicago, and at other times he retreated from the players to work on articles for Collier's and Metropolitan Magazine. During these absences, Bryant and O'Neill became lovers, not surprising in a group that professed and practiced free love. Reed, made aware of this new development, responded by inviting O'Neill to begin taking his meals with them. In a note to Field, Bryant said that her relationship with Reed was "so beautiful and so free! ... We don't interfere with each other at all ... we feel like children who will never grow up."

== Croton-on-Hudson ==
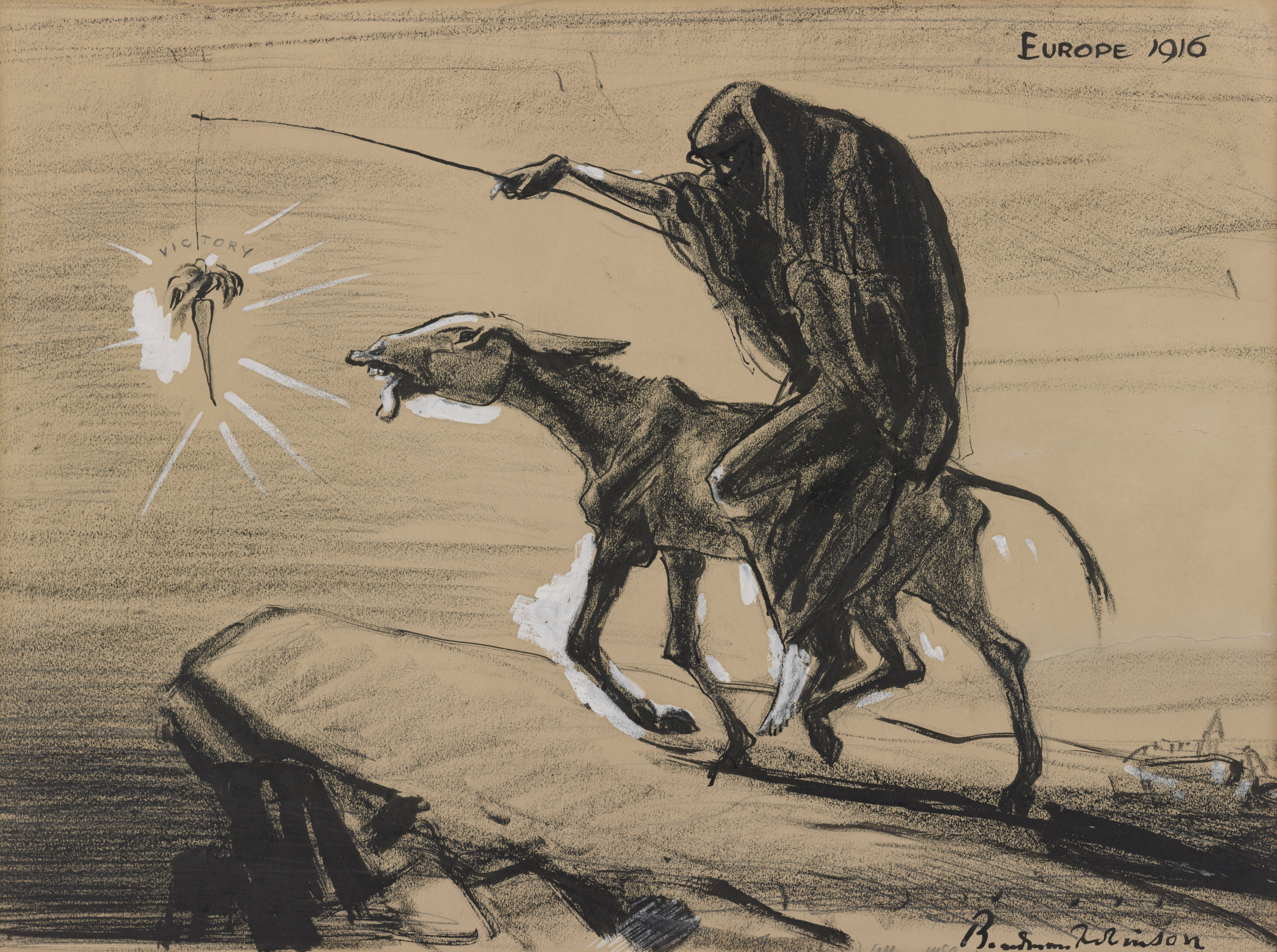
Europe 1916, an anti-war cartoon by Boardman Robinson, appeared in the October 1916 issue of The Masses, a magazine for which Bryant had begun writing articles and poems that same year.

After spending the month of September 1916 in a cottage they bought in Truro, Bryant and Reed returned to Greenwich Village, where the Provincetown Players planned to establish an alternative to Broadway theater. On weekends, they sojourned at Croton-on-Hudson, upriver from New York City, where Villagers including Eastman, Dodge, and illustrator Boardman Robinson and his wife had cottages. In October, Bryant and Reed bought their own place in Croton-on-Hudson. Meanwhile, Reed, who had had kidney ailments since childhood, was told by his doctors that he would need to have a kidney removed. The surgery, considered "gravely serious", was scheduled for mid-November. Reed wanted to protect Bryant by making her his legal heir, and they married on November 9 at the county clerk's office in Peekskill before Reed left on November 12 for surgery at Johns Hopkins Hospital in Baltimore.

Compounding their difficulties were Bryant's ongoing relationship with O'Neill and gynecological problems she was treated for while Reed was in the hospital. When he returned from Baltimore in mid-December, Reed and Bryant retreated full-time to Croton-on-Hudson to recuperate and to focus on writing. They made plans to travel to China in 1917 to cover events for American publications, but in January the plans fell through when U.S. entry into World War I against Germany became highly likely. (The U.S. entered the war on April 6.) To boost their finances, they sold the cottage in Truro to Margaret Sanger, and Reed pawned his father's gold watch. At the same time, his strong anti-war positions, enunciated in The Masses and elsewhere, alienated most of his employers, further reducing his income. Adding to these stresses was Reed's confession to Bryant that he had had multiple love affairs, and the subsequent unhappiness between Bryant and Reed led to a temporary separation. When she expressed a desire to go to Europe, he helped her convince John N. Wheeler, who had recently formed the Bell Syndicate, to issue her a press pass. Reed paid for her passage, and Bryant set sail in June to cover the war in France. Regrets quickly followed. According to Bryant biographer Virginia Gardner:

No sooner had they parted on board the ship than both Reed and Bryant were assailed by misgivings. An outpouring of letters from either side of the Atlantic followed. Both were suffering, both were confused, lonely, and miserable ... [The letters were] proof of the basically strong bond that held the two, the poet-reporter and social critic and the erratic, appealing woman he had rescued from the banality of middle-class existence in Portland.

On the voyage across the Atlantic, Bryant interviewed ambulance-service troops and others on board the Espagne and wrote news stories about them and about the threat of torpedo attacks. When she arrived in Paris, Bryant tried for several weeks to obtain permission from French authorities to visit the Western Front, but could not do so because of her limited journalistic experience and her sex. She ended up collecting information about the war from as many sources as she could meet in Paris, and sent her news stories to Reed, who edited them and forwarded them to Wheeler.

== Petrograd ==
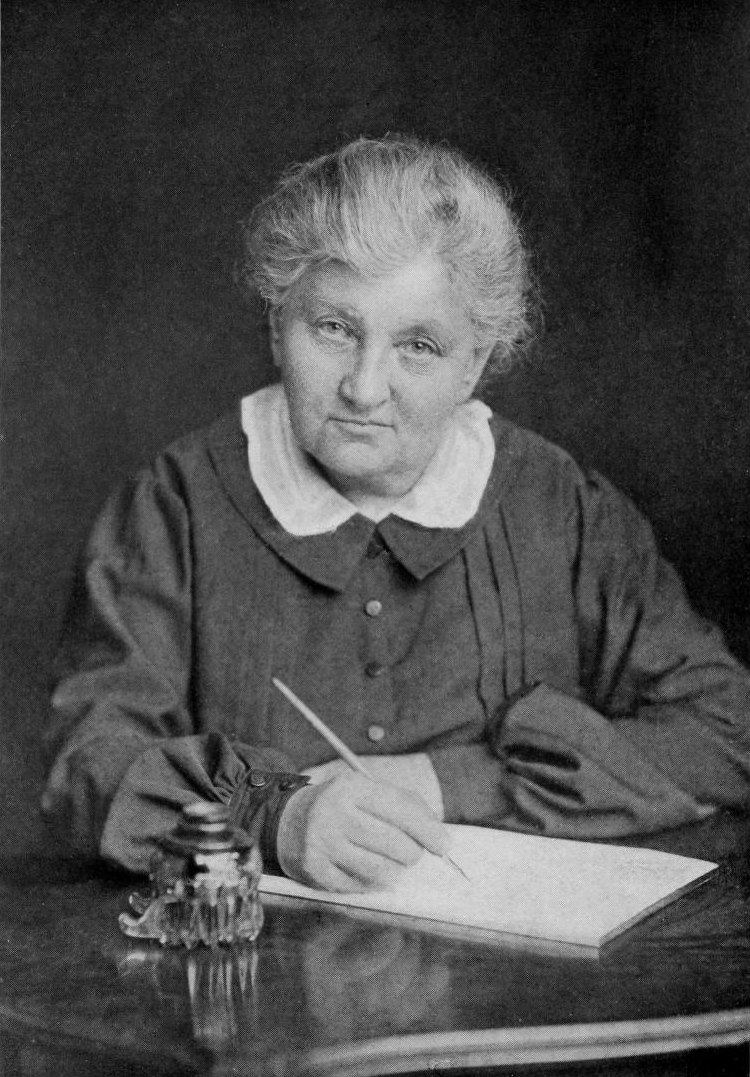
Katherine Breshkovsky, "grandmother of the revolution", was among the women Bryant interviewed in 1917.

In mid-August, when Bryant returned from France, Reed met her at the dock and told her to prepare to go to Petrograd four days later to cover the Russian Revolution. Eastman of The Masses had raised funds to pay Reed's travel expenses, and the Bell Syndicate assigned Bryant to report on the war "from a woman's point of view". Leaving New York on August 17, they arrived in Petrograd, which was then the capital of Russia, about six months after the forced abdication of the last Russian emperor, Nicholas II. Headed by Alexander Kerensky, the provisional government that had succeeded the emperor had already survived an attempted putsch by Major General Lavr Kornilov. Bryant and Reed entered the city after the Kornilov Affair and before the Bolsheviks overthrew the Kerensky government in the October Revolution.

Reconciled as a couple, and working from their room at the Angleterre Hotel, Bryant and Reed attended gatherings at the Smolny Institute and elsewhere in Petrograd and interviewed many leading political figures, including Vladimir Lenin, Leon Trotsky, and Kerensky, and both eventually compiled books—Six Red Months in Russia by Bryant and Reed's Ten Days That Shook the World—from their articles. Bryant circulated widely, covering Duma meetings, dining in public mess halls with soldiers and workers, and interviewing women revolutionaries. Among those were Catherine Breshkovsky, known as the "grandmother of the revolution", Maria Spiridonova, whom Bryant considered the most powerful woman in Russia, and Aleksandra Kollontai, who became People's Commissar of Social Welfare and the only woman in the Bolshevik cabinet. In the process, Bryant, who had often been overshadowed by her more famous husband, gained confidence in her professional reporting skills. By the time she returned to New York, her work was being read across North America. Gardner says:

[The] springtime of 1918 in the United States was a time of heightened contradictions. Openmindedness about the new Russian experiment in cities and the hinterland coexisted with the intensified patriotism of wartime ... No matter what appeared in their editorial pages, newspaper editors knew that feature stories with first-hand knowledge of the Revolution sold papers. The conservative and Republican Philadelphia Public Ledger syndicate bought Bryant's thirty-two stories and sold them to Hearst's New York American and to more than one hundred newspapers over the United States and Canada.

== New York ==
Leaving Russia before Reed, who wanted to report on the Bolshevik debate about Russian participation in the war with Germany, Bryant returned to New York, arriving on February 18, 1918. She found Greenwich Village much changed by the war: old friends had moved, rents had gone up, and tourists were replacing bohemians. Under government pressure, The Masses had shut down. Working out of a room at the Brevoort Hotel, Bryant wrote articles about the October Revolution and speeches or cables urging support of the workers' government in Russia.

Meanwhile, Reed, who was trying to get home, was unable to get State Department clearance for a visa and was detained in Oslo (then called Christiania), Norway, for more than a month. His letters were censored, and Bryant did not hear from him directly until April. On orders from Edgar Sisson of the U.S. Commission on Public Information, all of Reed's papers were confiscated when he arrived in New York on April 28. Unable to write about the October Revolution without his notes, Reed instead gave speeches advocating U.S. recognition of the new Russian government. That summer, the couple retreated to Croton-on-Hudson.

In August, during a long weekend in the arts colony at Woodstock, Bryant began what was to be a long-term, intermittent love affair with painter Andrew Dasburg, with whom she had been close for a couple of years. Returning to the Village in September, Bryant and Reed rented a small house at 1 Patchin Place. Later in the month, Reed was arrested for giving a speech in which he denounced the use of Allied troops in Russia; the specific charge against him was that he had used "disloyal, scurrilous and abusive language about the Military and Naval Forces of the United States". He was released on $5,000 bail. In separate cases that year, Reed stood trial with Eastman, Floyd Dell, and others from the former staff of The Masses for conspiracy to obstruct the draft of men to fight in World War I and for other alleged offenses related to published articles and cartoons; Reed's alleged crime in the latter case was that he had written a headline, "Knit a Strait-Jacket for Your Soldier Boy", for an article about mental illness among the U.S. troops. Bryant was questioned in The Masses cases but not charged. Both trials involving The Masses ended in hung juries, and the defendants were set free. In October, Bryant's first book, Six Red Months in Russia, was published to "mostly favorable reviews," and Reed resumed work on Ten Days That Shook the World after the government returned his notes. It would not be published until April 1919.

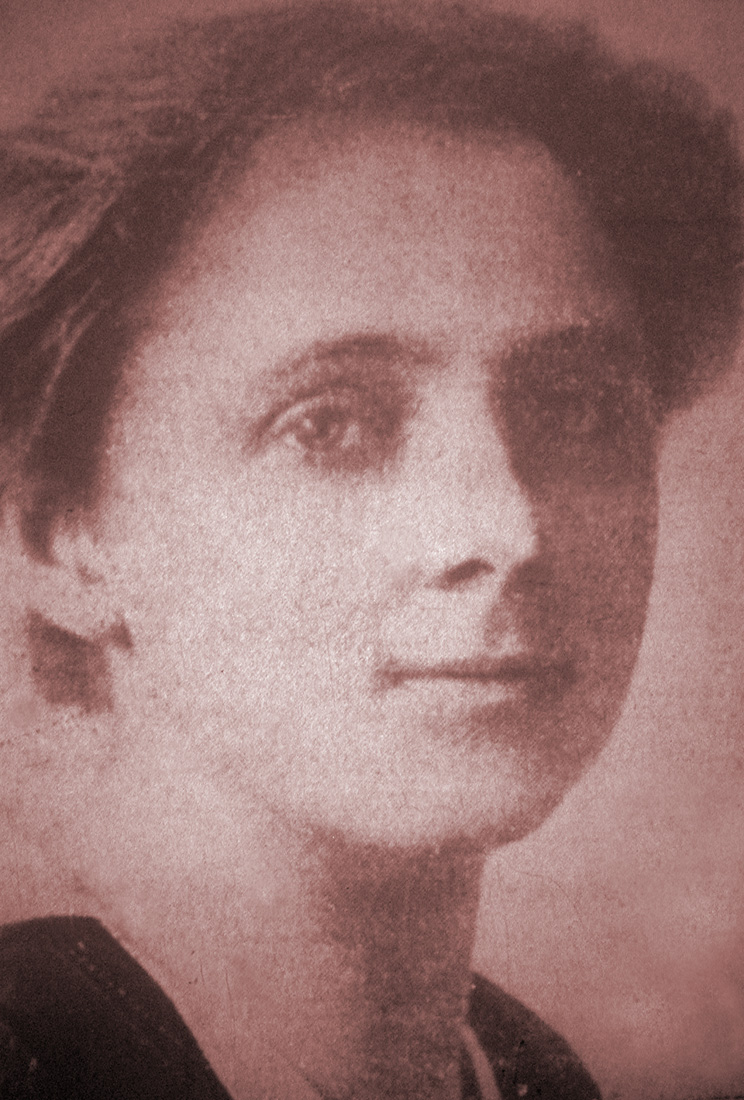
Anna Louise Strong in 1918, the year before she arranged Bryant's national speaking tour, "The Truth About Russia".

In February 1919, while still based in New York, Bryant went to Washington, D.C., to speak, along with Albert Rhys Williams, about the situation in Russia. She stayed in Washington long enough to participate in a National Woman's Party suffrage rally, during which she was arrested, arraigned, and sentenced to five days in jail. The specific charges against her and others, who had burned President Woodrow Wilson in effigy on the White House lawn, were "building fires on government property, standing on the coping around the White House, or attempting to make disorderly speeches." Among a group of women who refused bail, she spent at least three days in jail, during which she took part in a hunger strike. Upon her release, she insisted on testifying as an unfriendly witness before the Overman Committee, which had been set up to investigate Bolshevik activity in the United States. Deflecting questions about her religious beliefs, marriages, and other personal matters during her two days of testimony, she tried to convince the subcommittee, led by Senator Lee S. Overman, that Russia had a right to self-determination. Soon thereafter, she began a cross-country speaking tour, "The Truth About Russia", arranged by Anna Louise Strong, during which she addressed large audiences in Detroit, Chicago, Spokane, Seattle, San Francisco, Los Angeles, and other American cities. According to Gardner, Bryant was the first woman to defend Lenin and Trotsky at political gatherings across the United States. Gardner writes, "Her message was simple, 'Hands off Russia!' 'Bring the boys home!'"

After Bryant returned from her lecture tour in May, she and Reed spent the next few months mainly in Croton-on-Hudson writing, gardening, and in Reed's case, recuperating from influenza. In late August, Reed, who had joined the Socialist Party of America, was chosen by one of its factions, the Communist Labor Party of America (CLP), to visit Moscow to seek recognition for the CLP as the sole representative of the Communist International (Comintern) in the United States. Unlike Reed, Bryant avoided party membership. The U.S. government quickly outlawed the CLP and its competitor, the American Communist Party, headed by Louis Fraina. In danger of being arrested and unable to get a passport to go to Russia, Reed, disguised as a stoker, left the United States in late September 1919 on a Scandinavian ship headed for Europe. During the Palmer Raids and Red Scare days beginning in November 1919, he was charged with conspiring to overthrow the government by force. In March 1920, after visiting Moscow, he was arrested and incarcerated in Finland on his way home. Three months later, he was returned to Moscow in a prisoner exchange between the White (anti-Bolshevik) Finns of the Finnish Civil War and the Bolsheviks. From Reval (Tallinn), Estonia, he cabled Bryant, "Passport home refused. Temporarily returning headquarters. Come if possible."

== Reuniting with Reed in Moscow ==
Traveling without passport, Bryant, disguised as the wife of a Swedish businessman, arrived in Petrograd in late August 1920. When Bryant reached Petrograd, Reed was in Baku, attending the "first congress of peoples of the east" (Oriental Congress) with the Comintern executive committee. He had left a letter for her with several possibilities for lodging, one of which was a room he had arranged for her at the Dielovoy Hotel in Moscow. This is where, on September 15, they finally reconnected, spending the next few days together and visiting Lenin, Trotsky, Hungarian revolutionary Béla Kun, and Enver Pasha, a former minister of war in the Ottoman Empire. Bryant began filing Moscow news stories with the International News Service, which had hired her before she left New York.

In a letter dated November 14, 1920, she explained her trip and reunion with Reed:

I found Jack after my illegal journey across the world. I had to skirt Finland, sail twelve days in the Arctic ocean, hide in a fisherman's shack four days to avoid the police with a Finnish officer and a German, both under sentence of death in their own countries. When I did reach Soviet territory I was at the opposite end of Russia from Jack. When I reached Moscow he was in Baku at the Oriental Congress. Civil war raged in the Ukraine. A military wire reached him and he came back in an armored train. On the morning of September 15th he ran shouting into my room. [...]

We had only one week together before he went to bed, and we were terribly happy to find each other. [...]

We visited together Lenin, Trotsky, Kaminev, Enver Pasha, Bela Kun, we saw the Ballet and Prince Igor and the new and old galleries.

== Reed's death ==
A week after Reed's return from Baku, he began to experience dizziness and headaches, thought at first to be symptoms of influenza. Five days later, when he became delirious, doctors diagnosed typhus and sent him to the hospital. There, with Bryant by his side, he died on October 17, 1920, a few days shy of his 33rd birthday.

When he died I did not believe it. I must have been there hours afterwards still talking to him and holding his hands.

And then there came a time when the body lay in state with all military honor, in the Labor temple, guarded by fourteen soldiers from the Red Army. Many times I went there and saw the soldiers standing stiffly, their bayonets gleaming under the lights and the red star of Communism on their military caps.

Jack lay in a long silver coffin banked with flowers and streaming banners. Once the soldiers uncovered it for me so I might touch the white forehead with my lips for the last time.

On the day of Reed's funeral, in keeping with Russian custom, Bryant walked alone behind the hearse, at the head of the funeral procession. She collapsed during the burial from a heart attack.

At the funeral I suffered a very severe heart attack which by the merest scratch I survived. Specialists have agreed that I have strained my heart because of the long days and nights I watched beside Jack's bed [...]

[I] fell on the ground and could not speak or cry.

I do not remember the speeches. I remember more the broken notes of the speakers' voices. I was aware that after a long time they ceased and the banners began to dip back and forth in salute. I heard the first shovel of earth go rolling down and then something snapped in my brain.

She awoke in her hotel room. Among those at her bedside were Emma Goldman and Alexander Berkman, who had been arrested in the United States and deported to Russia in late 1919.

After an eternity I woke up in my own bed. Emma Goldman was standing there and Berkman, and two doctors and a tall young officer from the Red Army. They were whispering and I went to sleep again.

== Further reporting ==
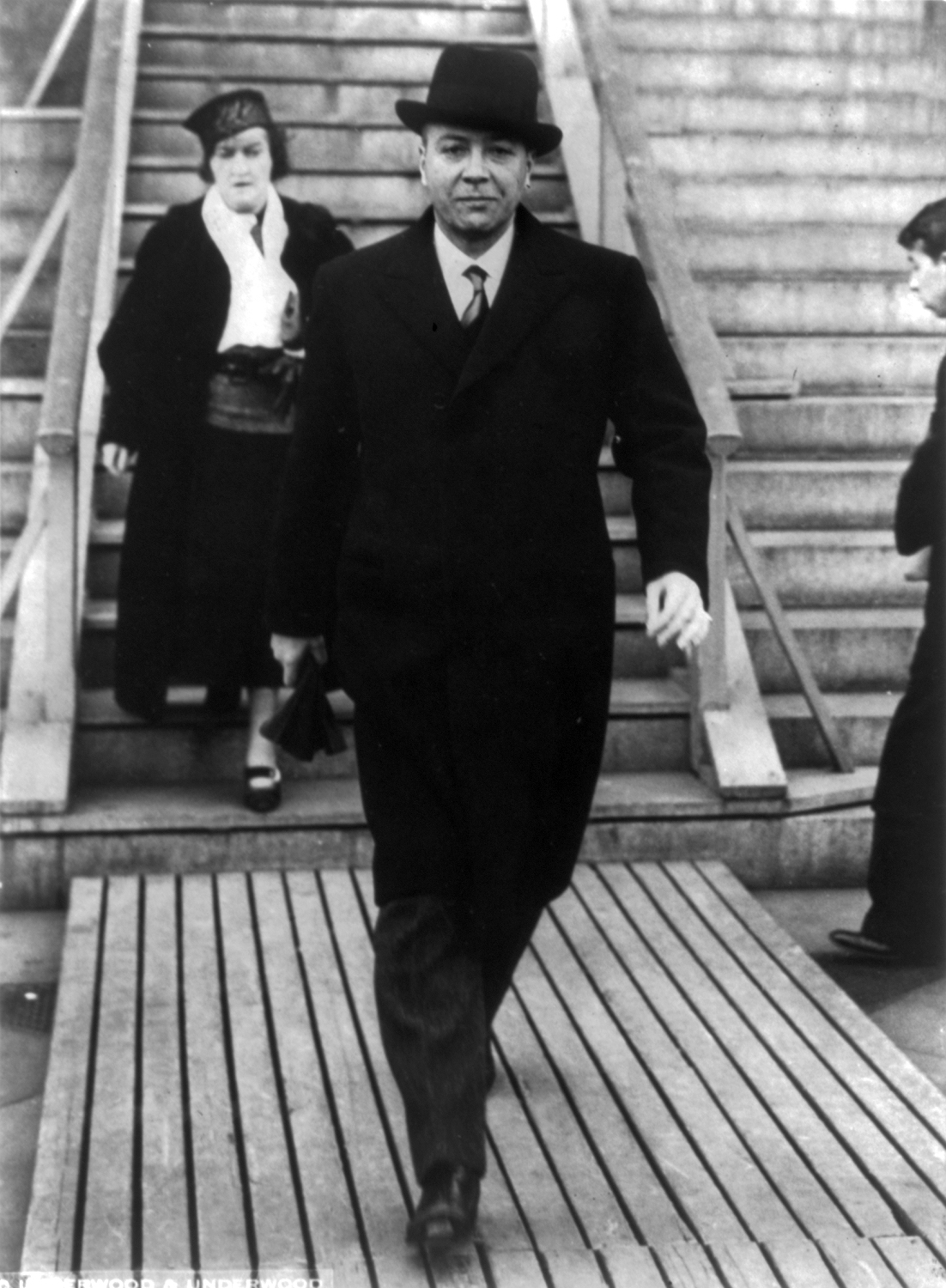
William C. Bullitt, Bryant's third husband, who in 1933 became the first U.S. ambassador to the Soviet Union.

After Reed's death, Bryant obtained Lenin's approval for a trip to the southern Russian border and neighboring countries. She went by train over the Kazakh Steppe, through areas hard hit by famine, to Tashkent and Bukhara and to the borders of Iran and Afghanistan, interviewing and taking notes.

She returned to the U.S. in mid-summer 1921, and stayed for about a year, during which she first met William Christian Bullitt Jr., then managing editor of film stories at Paramount, to try to persuade him to make Ten Days That Shook the World into a film. Bullitt, a Yale University graduate from a Philadelphia family of great wealth, had worked as a journalist specializing in foreign affairs, then as a diplomat in the United States Department of State before retiring temporarily from politics and taking the Paramount job. He later returned to politics and became the first U.S. ambassador to the Soviet Union. Bryant and Bullitt had in common their interests in Russia, journalism, and Jack Reed, whom Bullitt greatly admired. Although Paramount did not pursue the Ten Days project, Bullitt was charmed by Bryant and began the amorous pursuit of her that two years later ended in marriage. In August, the New York American, a Hearst newspaper, began publishing a series of 16 of Bryant's articles describing famine in Russia, Lenin's New Economic Policy, the end of the Russian Civil War, and related topics. In general, the tone of these articles was "sober and at times unsparing, in contrast to her often rapturous reporting in her 1918 stories."

In October, she was the main speaker at a memorial for Reed in New York City, and she spent some of her time collecting Reed's papers for possible publication. She also arranged with King Features Syndicate, another Hearst agency, to return to Russia to write portraits of Russians. The first of these appeared in print in June 1922, and led to her second book, Mirrors of Moscow, in 1923. Bryant's travels in Europe this time included Moscow, Berlin, London, Paris, and other cities. By late October, she was in Rome, accompanied by Bullitt. Here in late 1922, she wrote about Benito Mussolini, the fascist leader who had just come to power and with whom she had obtained an interview. Gathering material from a variety of sources, including Madame Rachele Mussolini, Bryant wrote a feature article, "Mussolini Relies Upon Efficiency to Restore Italy", published in the New York American in early 1923. She described the future dictator this way:

I will always think of Mussolini as one of the oddest characters in history, and I will remember him as I last saw him in the great white and gold foyer of the Grand Hotel, under a huge crystal candelabra slouching wearily into a graceful Louis XV ivory and enameled chair. His pale, heavy-boned face showed signs of sleeplessness. His strong body was bulging over the sides of the seat; his legs were spread wide over the pale, rose-colored velvet carpet. There was a little cup of black coffee, absurdly delicate, beside his gnarled work-warped hand.

Leaving Rome to cover the Turkish War of Independence for the International News Service, Bryant lived with Bullitt in a villa in Constantinople in early 1923. While Bullitt worked on a novel, It's Not Done, published in 1926 and dedicated to Bryant, she covered events related to the rise of Mustafa Kemal Atatürk, the first president of the Republic of Turkey. From her base in Turkey, she ventured to Palermo to interview the deposed king of Greece, Constantine I, and to Athens to interview his son, George II. Shortly thereafter, Bryant suspended her journalistic career to focus on family matters.

== Paris ==
Later in 1923, Bryant and Bullitt moved to Paris, where they married in December. Two months later, Bryant gave birth to her only child, Anne Moen Bullitt. (Note: Bryant sometimes spelled her father's last name, Mohan, as Moen.) In 1925 she and Bullitt added to their family an 8-year-old boy, Refik Ismaili Bey, whom they had met in Turkey. As the wife of a rich man, Bryant had duties related to the running of an upper-class household: "the management of servants, the ordering of food and planning of menus, house decoration, flower arrangement, keeping a social calendar." She told one visitor to her home that she considered her new life "useless", and the Bryant–Bullitt marriage began to unravel. In "Louise Bryant Grows Old", historian Christine Stansell examines the great changes in Bryant's life after her marriage to Bullitt:

The entrance of William Bullitt into Louise Bryant's life confounds the intertwined stories of the grief-stricken war widow, the radical heroine, and the champion of the oppressed. The marriage is a puzzle, both biographically and historically. Biographically, it proved to be a disaster, in contrast to Bryant's earlier romantic choices, which had been smart and fulfilling.

Although Bryant continued to write, little of her work toward the end of her life was published. Her last piece of journalism, "A Turkish Divorce", about Atatürk's treatment of women, appeared in The Nation in August 1925.

By 1926, Bryant, who had generally abstained from alcohol earlier in life, was suffering from painful and incurable adiposis dolorosa (Dercum's disease) and was drinking heavily. Bullitt, citing his wife's drinking and alleging that she was involved in a lesbian relationship with English painter and sculptor Gwen Le Gallienne, a stepdaughter of writer Richard Le Gallienne, (Note: Gardner says "daughter", but other sources explain that Gwen was Le Gallienne's stepdaughter via his marriage to Irma Hinton Perry, Gwen's mother.) divorced Bryant in 1930 and won sole custody of Anne. Bryant remained in Paris, occasionally advising writer Claude McKay, and briefly assisting researchers from Harvard University in preserving Reed's papers.

== Death and legacy ==
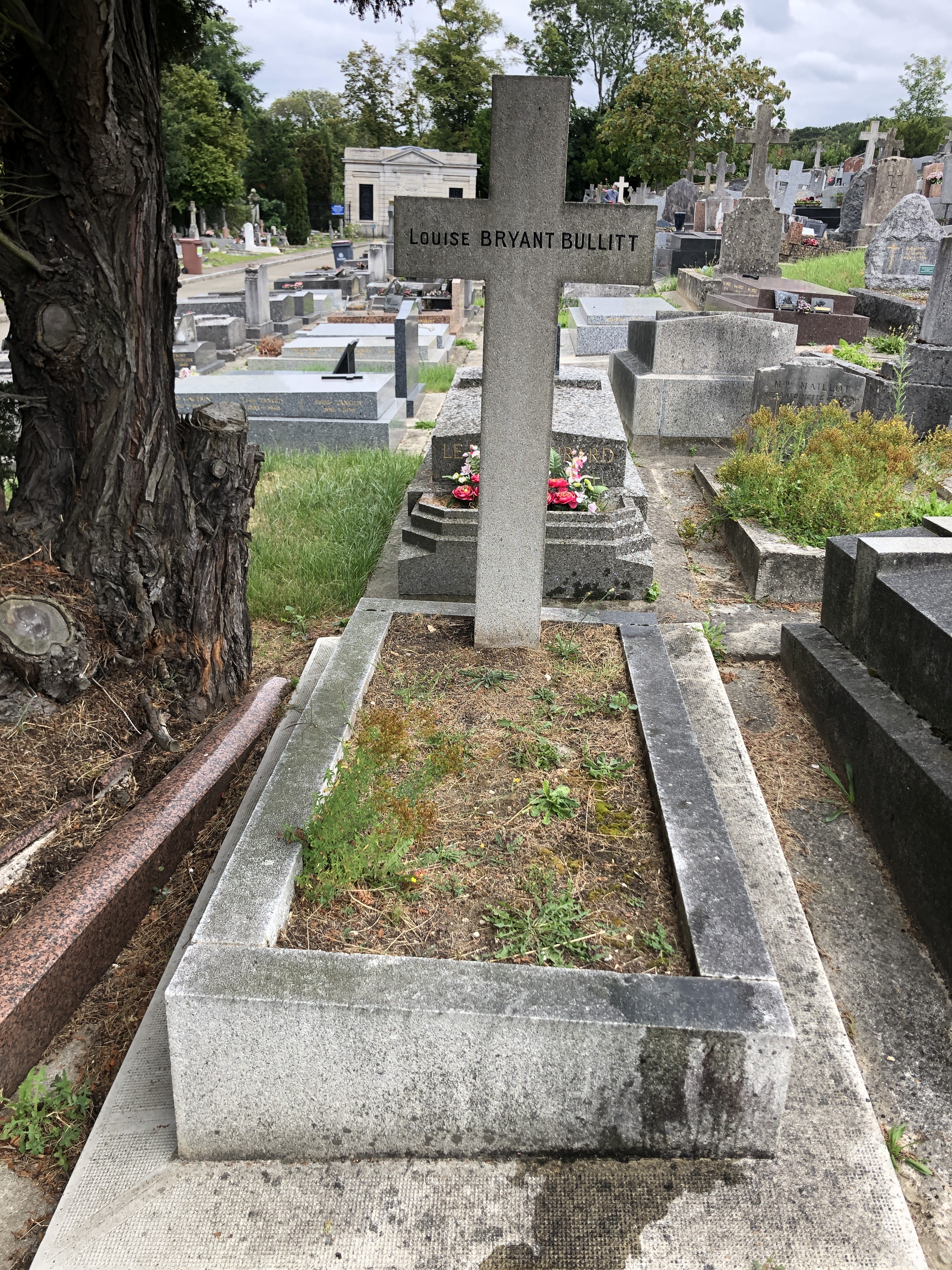
Grave of Louise Bryant

Bryant died on January 6, 1936, of a brain hemorrhage in Sèvres, in the suburbs of Paris, and is buried in Cimetière des Gonards in Versailles. In 1998, three volunteers from the Oregon Cultural Heritage Commission went to Paris to find the grave, which they discovered was crumbling, undated, and scheduled for removal. Through the commission's efforts as well as donations, including some from relatives of Bryant and Bullitt, the grave was restored.

The Bryant–Reed story is told in the 1981 film Reds, starring Diane Keaton as Bryant and Warren Beatty as Reed. Supporting actors include Jack Nicholson as Eugene O'Neill, Maureen Stapleton as Emma Goldman, Jerzy Kosiński as Grigory Zinoviev (one of the Bolshevik leaders), and Edward Herrmann as Max Eastman.

== Bibliography ==
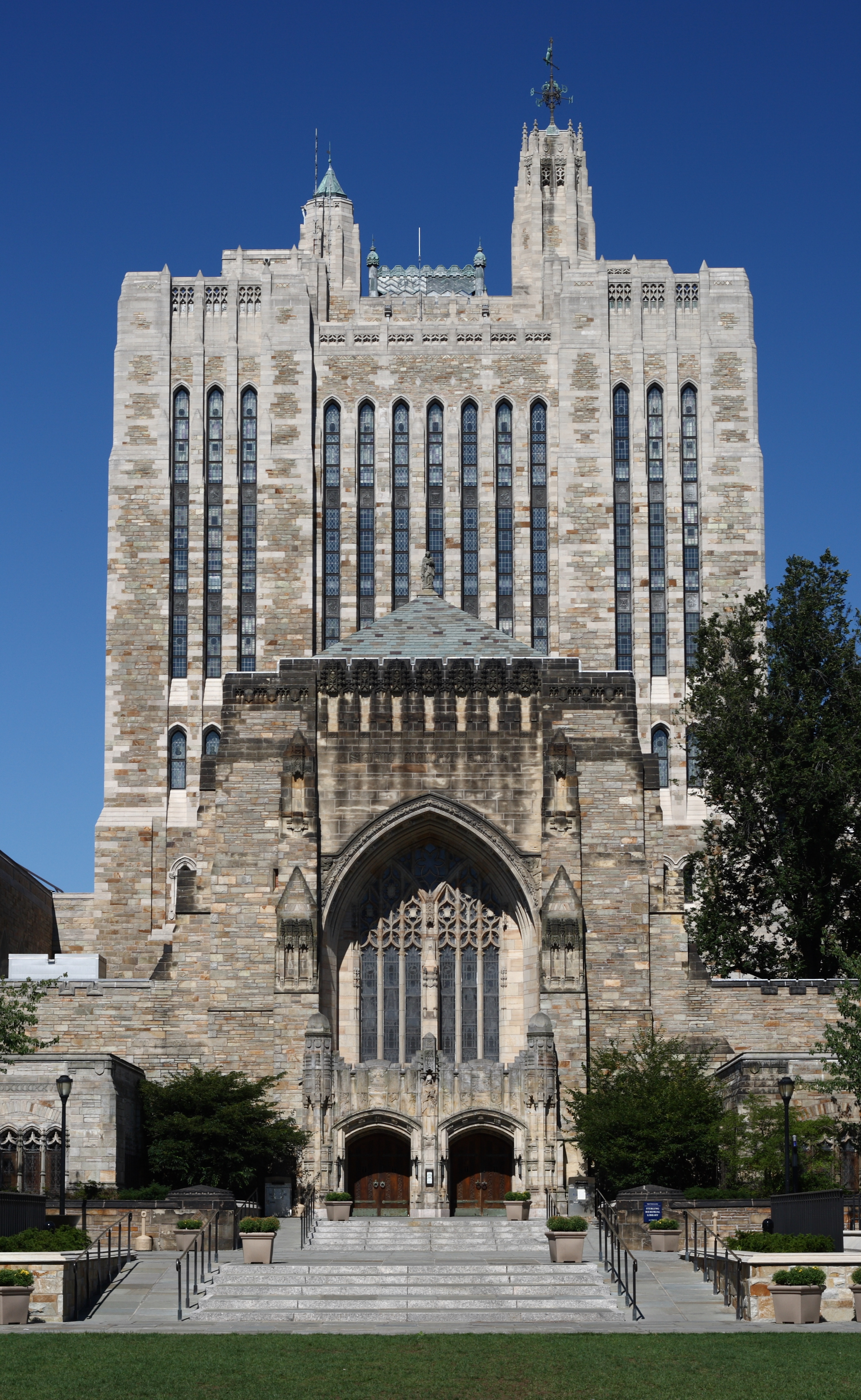
Sterling Memorial Library at Yale University houses the Bryant papers

Bryant's personal papers were transferred to Bullitt, with whom they remained until their daughter, Anne, donated the collection to Yale University in 2004. They exist as separate collections, the Louise Bryant Papers (MS 1840) and the William C. Bullitt Papers (MS 112) in the Sterling Memorial Library at Yale. The Louise Bryant Papers consists of about 19 linear feet (5.8 m) of letters, texts, photographs, art, and other materials that she created or collected between 1916 and 1936.

Bryant's early journalistic work appeared in college publications and in newspapers—The Spectator, where Bryant was society editor, and The Oregonian, for whom she freelanced—in Portland. Later work appeared in independent magazines, including The Masses, and The Liberator, Some, written for the New York American and other Hearst publications, were syndicated to newspapers across North America. Collections of her articles appeared in book form in 1918 and 1923. Below is a partial list of her published work.

=== Books ===
- School Feeding: Its History and Practice at Home and Abroad
- Six Red Months in Russia
- Mirrors of Moscow

=== Plays ===
- The Game: A Morality Play in One Act

=== Articles ===
- "Art for American Children"
- "Fables for Proletarian Children"
- "The Last Days with John Reed: A Letter from Louise Bryant"
- "Two Judges"
