= Francis Xavier Dercum =

American physician (1856–1931)

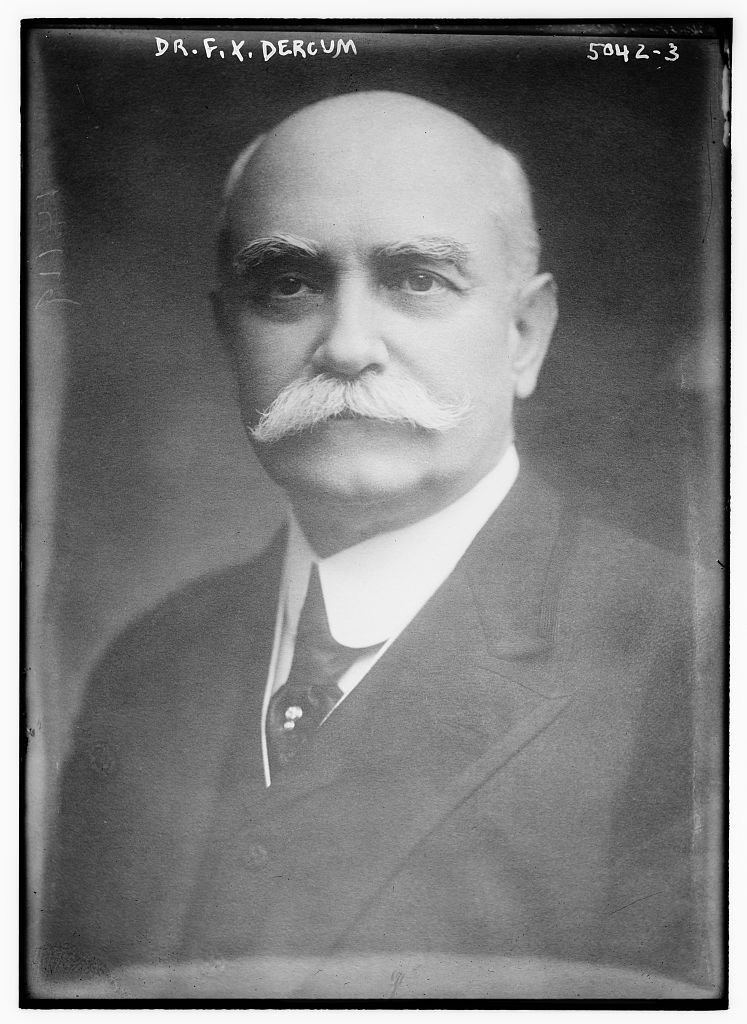
- Francis Xavier Dercum circa 1915
- Born: August 10, 1856; Philadelphia, Pennsylvania, U.S.
- Died: April 24, 1931 (aged 74); Philadelphia, Pennsylvania, U.S.
- Resting place: West Laurel Hill Cemetery, Bala Cynwyd, Pennsylvania, U.S.
- Education: University of Pennsylvania School of Medicine
- Medical career
- Profession: Physician
- Institutions: University of Pennsylvania School of Medicine; Philadelphia General Hospital; Jefferson Medical College

Francis Xavier Dercum (August 10, 1856 – April 24, 1931) was an American physician and educator who first described the disease Adiposis dolorosa (also known as Dercum's disease). He served as chief of the Nervous Disease Clinic at the University of Pennsylvania and as professor of neurology at Jefferson Medical College. He worked as a neurologist at the Philadelphia General Hospital for almost 25 years. He partnered with Eadweard Muybridge to create some of the first motion picture images of patients with neurological movement disorders. He served as editor of A Textbook on Nervous Disorders which was the first multi-authored textbook in neurology. He served as president of the American Philosophical Society. He treated Ima Hogg, the first lady of Texas, for severe depression in 1918 and President Woodrow Wilson after a stroke in 1919.

== Early life and education ==
Dercum was born August 10, 1856, in Philadelphia, Pennsylvania, to Ernest Albert and Susanna Erhart Dercum. His father was a successful businessman and sold books and grain. He was educated at the local public schools and graduated from Central High School in 1873. He attended the University of Pennsylvania medical school. He received his medical degree in 1877 and a Doctorate of Philosophy in 1878. He received an honorary Doctor of Science degree in 1927 from Jefferson Medical College.

== Career ==
He began his medical practice and served as a pathologist at the State Mental Hospital in Norristown, Pennsylvania. In 1879, at the University of Pennsylvania, he was a demonstrator in histology. In 1881, he was demonstrator in the physiology laboratory, and in 1882, he was an instructor in nervous diseases, also at the University of Pennsylvania. From 1883 to 1892, Dercum served as chief of the Nervous Disease Clinic at the University of Pennsylvania. He took an unpaid role as neurologist at the Philadelphia General Hospital in 1887 and worked there for approximately 25 years.

In 1885, he worked with Eadweard Muybridge to create some of the earliest motion pictures of medical subjects including many with neurological movement disorders including dyskinetic cerebral palsy, hemiparesis, poliomyelitis, tabes dorsalis, and tremor.

Dercum pursued research endeavors. He studied the semicircular canals and, in 1879, he published an article on their morphology. In 1892, he was the first to publish a description of Adiposis dolorosa. He published over 200 articles including several textbooks, in the medical areas of anatomy, physiology, pathology, psychology, and therapeutics. He served as editor of A Textbook on Nervous Disorders which was the first multi-authored textbook in neurology.

He accepted a role as professor of neurology at Jefferson Medical College in 1892 and became professor of nervous and mental illnesses in 1900.

Dercum was active in many professional and learned societies. In 1878, he was elected a member of the Academy of Natural Sciences. He was a founding member of the Philadelphia Neurological Society in 1884. He was president of the American Neurological Association in 1886, and a fellow of the American College of Physicians. He was elected a member of the American Philosophical Society in 1892 and served as its president. He served as chairman for the section on Nervous and Mental Diseases of the American Medical Association in 1915. He held memberships in neurological societies in Vienna, Budapest and London, and was elected to the Neurological Society of Paris. In 1922, the French government awarded him the Chevalier of the Legion of Honor.

During World War I, he served on the Pennsylvania Medical Advisory Board and the Medical Reserve Board. He was fluent in French and German.

In 1918, he treated Ima Hogg, the first lady of Texas, for severe depression.

After President Wilson suffered a stroke in 1919, Dercum was called by Wilson's physician Cary T. Grayson to the White House to help treat him. Dercum diagnosed Wilson with a "severe organic hemiplegia" most likely caused by a thrombosis of the middle cerebral artery in the right side of his brain. Wilson's left leg and arm were flaccid and the left side of his face drooped. Grayson released a statement that was intentionally misleading, stating that Wilson was suffering from "nervous exhaustion". His true health condition was kept a secret from Congress, the public, and vice president Thomas Riley Marshall.

Wilson was bed ridden for weeks and restricted from being seen by most people except his wife, Grayson, and Dercum. It was he who advised that the President remain in office despite his crippling thrombosis, since with such resignation "the greatest incentive to recovery is gone." It was also Dercum who encouraged the president's wife, Edith Bolling Wilson, to stand in as his virtual substitute. Dercum continued as the president's physician until Wilson's death in 1924

Dercum died April 23, 1931, while attending a meeting of the American Philosophical Society. He was interred at West Laurel Hill Cemetery, Woodlawn Section, Lot 38, Bala Cynwyd, Pennsylvania.

== Publications ==
- A Textbook on Nervous Diseases, Philadelphia: Lea Brothers & Co., 1895
- Report of Three Cases of Beri-Beri, Journal of Nervous & Mental Disease, 20(2) (Feb. 1895): 103–109
- Two cases of Adiposa Dolorosa, Transactions, College of Physicians of Philadelphia, 1902
- Rest, Mental Therapeutics, Suggestion, 1903
- A Clinical Manual of Mental Diseases. Philadelphia; London: W. B. Saunders Co., 1913
- “The Treatment of Mental Affections as they are Met with in General Practice,” New York Medical Journal (March 13, 1915)
- Hysteria and accident compensation: Nature of Hysteria and the Lesson of the Post-Litigation Results, Philadelphia: The Geo. T. Bisel Co., 1916
- Metabolism in Insanity, Journal of the American Medical Association, (April 15, 1916): 1183–1188
- A Clinical Manual of Mental Diseases, 1917
- Rest, Suggestion, and Other Therapeutic Measures in Nervous and Mental Disease. Philadelphia: P. Blakiston's Son & Co., 1917
- The Interpretation of the Neuroses: Biologic, Pathologic and Clinical Considerations, together with an Evaluation of the Psychogenic Factors, Journal of the American Medical Association, (April 28, 1917): 1223–1227
- An Essay on the Physiology of Mind: An Interpretation based on Biological, Morphological, Physical and Chemical Considerations. Philadelphia; London: W. B. Saunders Co., 1922
- The Biology of the Internal Secretions, Philadelphia and London: W.B. Saunders Co., 1924
