= Karen Herbst =

American endocrinologist

Dr Karen Herbst is an American endocrinologist. She is noted for her work in Dercum's Disease, lipedema, multiple symmetric lipomatosis, familial multiple lipomatosis, and angiolipomatosis at both the VA San Diego Healthcare System and University of Arizona College of Medicine in Tucson, Arizona.

Herbst is a graduate of Rush Medical College (1996). She also had a residency at the University of Washington School of Medicine (2000) and fellowship at the University of Washington School of Medicine, Endocrinology in 2002. Her work into lipedema has been conducted at the University of Arizona College of Medicine, Tucson, as part of the Treatment, Research and Education of Adipose Tissue (TREAT) Program. It involves research into adipose tissue and metabolism shifts in women. Her patients are mainly from the United States, but also come from Europe, the Middle East and Australia. One of her main goals is to improve medical imaging and phenotyping of fatty tissue, and to provide better awareness and care for the disease.

Herbst is a member of the American Board of Internal Medicine.
