= Secondary lymphedema =

Secondary lymphedema is a condition characterized by swelling of the soft tissues in which an excessive amount of lymph has accumulated, and is caused by certain malignant diseases such as Hodgkin's disease and Kaposi sarcoma.

Secondary lymphedema also can be caused by several non-malignant diseases, such as lipedema, and can result from the removal of lymph nodes during various cancer surgeries, especially for breast and prostate cancers.

Typical diagnostic tests for secondary lymphedema include limb and volume circumference tests to evaluate fluid displacement in the affected area, although imaging tests such as ultrasound and lymphoscintigraphy are also commonly used.

One way that secondary lymphedema can be treated is through lymphatic grafting, where a functional lymph node is removed from a different part of the body and routed into the network of the lymphatic vessels in the affected lymphatic area on the body, usually in the upper limbs.

== See also ==
- Lymphedema
- Skin lesion
