= DYRK3 =

Protein-coding gene in humans

Identifiers
- Aliases: DYRK3, DYRK5, RED, REDK, hYAK3-2, dual specificity tyrosine phosphorylation regulated kinase 3
- External IDs: OMIM: 603497; MGI: 1330300; GeneCards: DYRK3
Enzyme activity
EC #	BRENDA	ExPASy	KEGG	MetaCyc
2.7.12.1	↗	↗	↗	↗

Gene location (Human)
Chr.	Chromosome 1 (human)
Band	1q32.1	Start	206,635,536 bp
Band	1q32.1	End	206,684,419 bp

Gene location (Mouse)
Chr.	Chromosome 1 (mouse)
Band	1|1 E4	Start	131,055,192 bp
Band	1|1 E4	End	131,066,077 bp
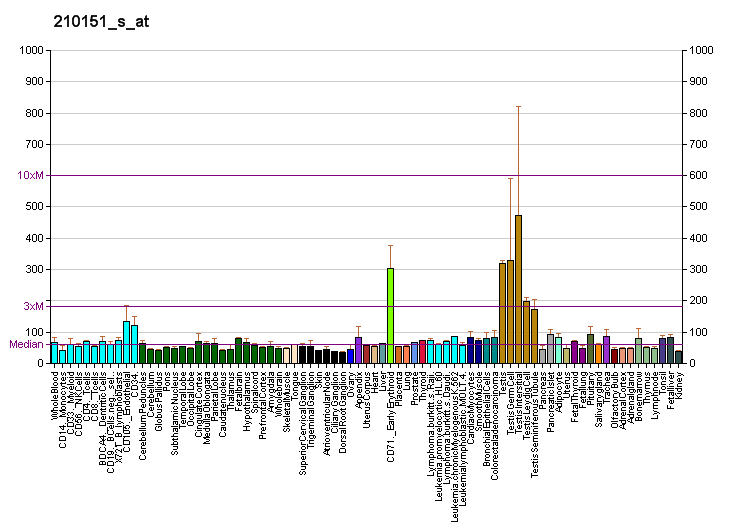
RNA expression pattern
Bgee	Human / Mouse (ortholog); Top expressed in: beta cell; left testis; right testis; male germ cell; sperm; vena cava; cartilage tissue; stromal cell of endometrium; apex of heart; mucosa of urinary bladder / Top expressed in: seminiferous tubule; spermatid; fetal liver hematopoietic progenitor cell; spermatocyte; respiratory epithelium; nasal epithelium; olfactory epithelium; parotid gland; facial motor nucleus; ventricular zone; More reference expression data
BioGPS	More reference expression data
Gene ontology
Molecular function	transferase activity; protein kinase activity; protein serine/threonine/tyrosine kinase activity; protein tyrosine kinase activity; nucleotide binding; ATP binding; magnesium ion binding; metal ion binding; kinase activity; protein serine/threonine kinase activity
Cellular component	nucleus; nucleoplasm; cytosol; intracellular membrane-bounded organelle; cytoplasm; cytoplasmic stress granule; pericentriolar material; microtubule organizing center; cytoskeleton; nuclear speck
Biological process	erythrocyte differentiation; protein phosphorylation; peptidyl-tyrosine phosphorylation; phosphorylation; stress granule disassembly; negative regulation of apoptotic process; negative regulation of DNA damage response, signal transduction by p53 class mediator; regulation of cellular response to stress; regulation of TORC1 signaling; cell cycle; nuclear speck organization; cell division; positive regulation of cell cycle G2/M phase transition; organelle disassembly
Sources:Amigo / QuickGO
Orthologs
Databases	NCBI: entry; OMA: entry
Species	Human	Mouse
Entrez	8444	226419
Ensembl	ENSG00000143479	ENSMUSG00000016526
UniProt	O43781	Q922Y0
RefSeq (mRNA)	NM_001004023; NM_003582	NM_145508
RefSeq (protein)	NP_001004023; NP_003573	NP_663483
Location (UCSC)	Chr 1: 206.64 – 206.68 Mb	Chr 1: 131.06 – 131.07 Mb
PubMed search
- Wikidata
View/Edit Human	View/Edit Mouse

Dual specificity tyrosine-phosphorylation-regulated kinase 3 is an enzyme that in humans is encoded by the DYRK3 gene.

This gene product belongs to the DYRK family of dual-specificity protein kinases that catalyze autophosphorylation on serine/threonine and tyrosine residues. The members of this family share structural similarity, however, differ in their substrate specificity, suggesting their involvement in different cellular functions. The encoded protein has been shown to autophosphorylate on tyrosine residue and catalyze phosphorylation of histones H3 and H2B in vitro. Alternatively spliced transcript variants encoding different isoforms have been identified.

== See also ==
- DYRK1A
- DYRK1B
- DYRK2
