= CLK2 =

Protein-coding gene in humans

Identifiers
- Aliases: CLK2, CDC like kinase 2
- External IDs: OMIM: 602989; MGI: 1098669; GeneCards: CLK2
Available structures
PDB	Ortholog search: PDBe RCSB
PDB	List of PDB id codes 3NR9
Enzyme activity
EC #	BRENDA	ExPASy	KEGG	MetaCyc
2.7.12.1	↗	↗	↗	↗

Gene location (Human)
Chr.	Chromosome 1 (human)
Band	1q22	Start	155,262,868 bp
Band	1q22	End	155,278,491 bp

Gene location (Mouse)
Chr.	Chromosome 3 (mouse)
Band	3|3 F1	Start	89,072,102 bp
Band	3|3 F1	End	89,084,228 bp
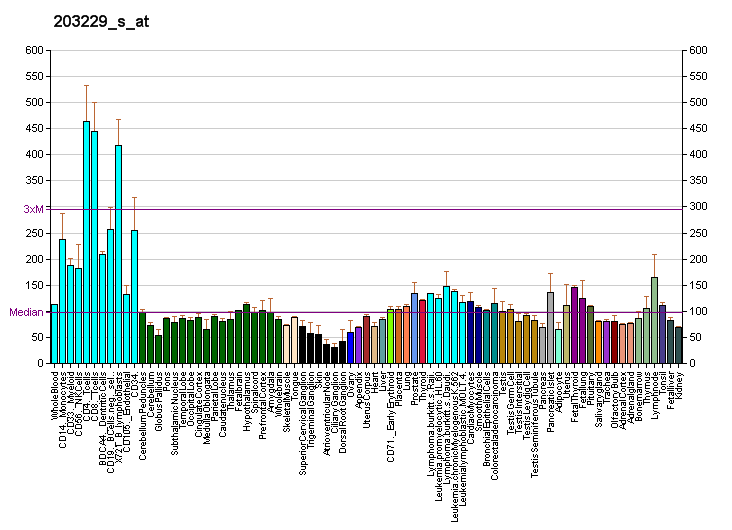
RNA expression pattern
Bgee	Human / Mouse (ortholog); Top expressed in: right uterine tube; right lobe of thyroid gland; pituitary gland; spleen; right adrenal cortex; left lobe of thyroid gland; anterior pituitary; right ovary; left ovary; left adrenal cortex / Top expressed in: genital tubercle; tail of embryo; zygote; secondary oocyte; neural layer of retina; condyle; fossa; epiblast; ventricular zone; granulocyte; More reference expression data
BioGPS	More reference expression data
Gene ontology
Molecular function	protein binding; kinase activity; protein serine/threonine kinase activity; protein kinase activity; protein serine/threonine/tyrosine kinase activity; ATP binding; nucleotide binding; protein tyrosine kinase activity; transferase activity; identical protein binding
Cellular component	nucleoplasm; nucleus; nuclear speck; nuclear body
Biological process	negative regulation of gluconeogenesis; regulation of RNA splicing; phosphorylation; protein phosphorylation; protein autophosphorylation; response to organic substance; response to ionizing radiation; peptidyl-tyrosine phosphorylation; response to retinoic acid
Sources:Amigo / QuickGO
Orthologs
Databases	NCBI: entry; OMA: entry
Species	Human	Mouse
Entrez	1196	12748
Ensembl	ENSG00000261893; ENSG00000176444	ENSMUSG00000068917
UniProt	P49760	O35491
RefSeq (mRNA)	NM_001291; NM_001294338; NM_001294339; NM_003993; NM_001363704	NM_001163432; NM_007712
RefSeq (protein)	NP_001281267; NP_001281268; NP_003984; NP_001350633	NP_001156904; NP_031738
Location (UCSC)	Chr 1: 155.26 – 155.28 Mb	Chr 3: 89.07 – 89.08 Mb
PubMed search
- Wikidata
View/Edit Human	View/Edit Mouse

Dual specificity protein kinase CLK2 is an enzyme that in humans is encoded by the CLK2 gene.

== Function ==
This gene encodes a member of the CLK family of dual specificity protein kinases. CLK family members have shown to interact with, and phosphorylate, serine/arginine-rich (SR) proteins of the spliceosomal complex, which is a part of the regulatory mechanism that enables the SR proteins to control RNA splicing. This protein kinase is involved in the regulation of several cellular processes and may serve as a link between cell cycle progression, apoptosis, and telomere length regulation.
