= Anne Moen Bullitt =

American socialite and horse breeder (1924–2007)

- Born: February 24, 1924; Paris, France
- Died: August 18, 2007 (aged 83); Republic of Ireland
- Occupation: horsebreeder
- Spouses: Caspar Wistar Barton Townsend (m. 1944–1947); Nicholas Benjamin Duke Biddle (m. 1947–1954); Roderic More O'Ferrall (m. 1955–1955); Daniel Baugh Brewster (m. 1967–1969)
- Parents: William Christian Bullitt Jr. (father); Anne Louise Mohan (Louise Bryant) (mother)

Anne Moen Bullitt (February 24, 1924 – August 18, 2007) was an American socialite, philanthropist, and equine breeder. In her youth she was regarded as a great beauty, and was known for assembling a wardrobe of rare and valuable classic haute couture items. She traveled widely and was married four times. In 1956, she bought a 700-acre estate and stud farm in County Kildare, where she became the first woman in Ireland to hold a trainer's license.

== Life and career ==
Anne Moen Bullitt was born 24 February 1924 in Paris, France. Bullitt's mother was Louise Bryant, a journalist, the lover of playwright Eugene O'Neill, and wife of John Reed, the American journalist with whom Bryant covered the Russian Revolution. (Bryant and Reed are portrayed in the Warren Beatty film, Reds.) Her father was a wealthy diplomat William C. Bullitt Jr., who had been in Russia at the time of the founding of the Soviet Union, as an unofficial observer for President Woodrow Wilson. The pair married in 1924, four years after Reed died of typhus in the Soviet Union, weeks before Anne Moen's birth. Anne's middle name came from her maternal grandfather, Hugh Mohan, an Irish American, but her father changed the spelling to sound more refined.

Bullitt had almost no contact with her mother, as her father had divorced her when Anne was an infant, claiming Bryant was an alcoholic and unfit mother. Accounts state young Anne followed her father everywhere, including on his diplomatic missions, and that he allowed her to hide, and listen, when he had meetings with other VIPs. Her mother died in 1936 when her daughter was 12.

By the time Bullitt had graduated from the Foxcroft School and made her society debut in 1941 at her father's Gwynedd Valley estate, she had crossed the Atlantic thirty-two times and lived abroad in London, Moscow, and Paris. She had appeared in newspaper photographs standing beside her diplomat father since early childhood, inserting her personal affairs to public scrutiny. When Bullitt suddenly married Staff Sargent Casper W. B. Townsend in 1944 without her father's presence, her union prompted discussion among the European elite. The marriage lasted for a short time. Her next husband was perceived as more suitable, and certain newspapers extensively reported on the society union of Bullitt and heir to millions, Nicholas Biddle. When the couple began to mix with prominent international horseracing figures, Bullitt met her third husband, Roderic O'Ferrall, whose family owned one of Ireland's most famous stud farms. The two wed in 1955. In an effort to leave her third marriage, Bullitt bought her own Irish estate and stud farm, Palmerstown House. She became the first woman in Ireland to be awarded a trainer's license.

In 1967, her father died, and Bullitt married her fourth husband, childhood friend and diplomat Daniel Brewster. They were divorced two years later. Before her death, she was declared a ward of the court by the effort of her American financial advisors. She died in a Dublin clinic and is buried on a family plot in Philadelphia. Bullitt had no children.

== Legacy ==
=== Fashion legacy ===
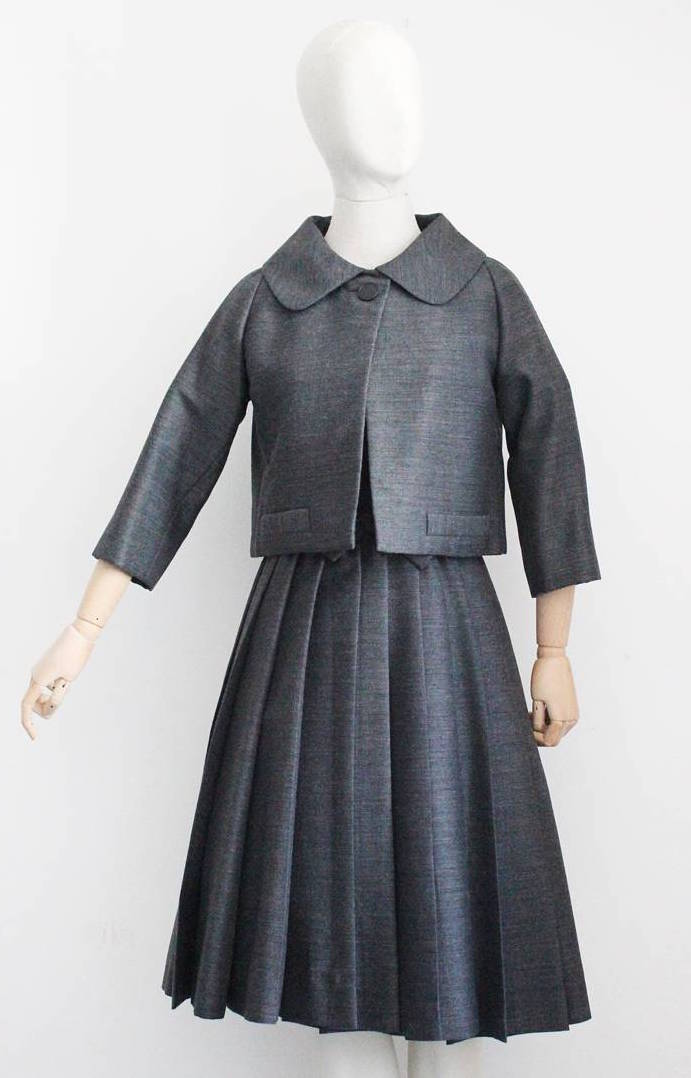
From Anne Moen Bullitt's wardrobe; Christian Dior by Yves Saint Laurent "Zou Zou" Suit, S/S 1958. Adnan Ege Kutay Collection

According to Decades magazine she was a great beauty. Decades magazine wrote she had an 18-inch waist, paired with a generous bosom. When her estate auctioned her extensive wardrobe of high-fashion items, at Christie's in 2009, the Irish Independent reported she had a 20-inch waist and an hourglass figure.

=== Parents' papers ===
Bullitt, and her advisors, donated the papers of her famous parents to Yale University, her father's alma mater, and she helped clarify some aspects of their lives. Her father was an early friend and supporter of pioneering psychotherapist Sigmund Freud, and he published a controversial book analyzing Woodrow Wilson, titled Thomas Woodrow Wilson – A Psychological Study. According to the New York Daily News, after Freud heard Bullitt declare she was so devoted to her father, she looked upon him as her god, he replied: "You know, I have developed a theory that male children's first love is their mother, and females', the father. But this is the first time a child has confirmed my theory."

=== Palmerston House and Stud ===
Bullitt's health failed in her old age. Her vision deteriorated to the point that she lived in just three rooms of her stately Irish home. In 2000, after she agreed to sell her estate to Jim Mansfield, surprising her financial advisors, who had recommended a different buyer. In 2000, they had her declared a ward of court. She died in Ireland in 2007.

In 2009, Bullitt's estate sued firms owned by Mansfield. Representatives claimed that a deposit he promised for the property that was supposed to be held in trust, and paid when the sale was completed, had been deposited with a company he owned, and never was paid. Her estate claimed that personal possession of Bullitt were improperly in the possession of Mansfield, including valuable works of art by Pablo Picasso and pistols once owned by George Washington.
