= DSTYK =

Protein-coding gene in humans

Identifiers
- Aliases: DSTYK, CAKUT1, DustyPK, RIP5, RIPK5, HDCMD38P, dual serine/threonine and tyrosine protein kinase, SPG23
- External IDs: OMIM: 612666; MGI: 1925064; GeneCards: DSTYK
Enzyme activity
EC #	BRENDA	ExPASy	KEGG	MetaCyc
2.7.12.1	↗	↗	↗	↗

Gene location (Human)
Chr.	Chromosome 1 (human)
Band	1q32.1	Start	205,142,505 bp
Band	1q32.1	End	205,211,702 bp

Gene location (Mouse)
Chr.	Chromosome 1 (mouse)
Band	1|1 E4	Start	132,345,293 bp
Band	1|1 E4	End	132,394,696 bp
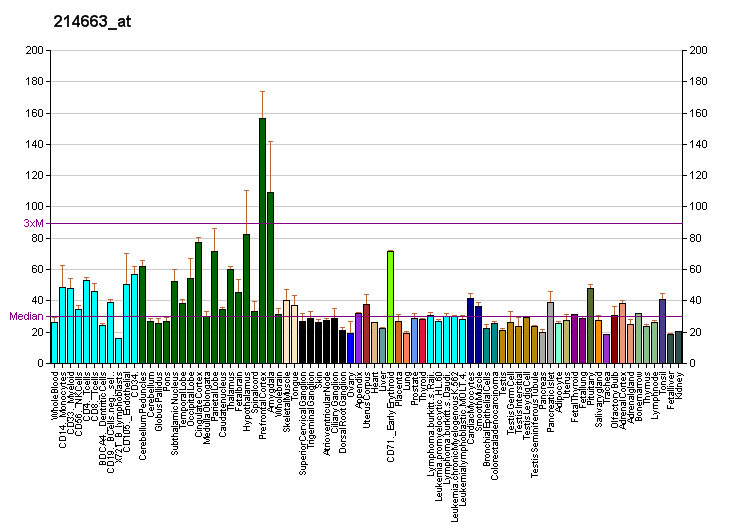

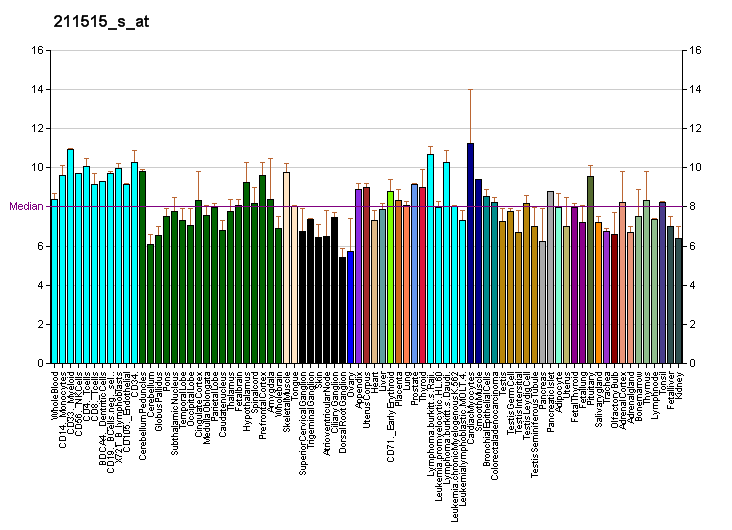
RNA expression pattern
Bgee	Human / Mouse (ortholog); Top expressed in: lateral nuclear group of thalamus; internal globus pallidus; superior vestibular nucleus; inferior ganglion of vagus nerve; ventral tegmental area; pons; pars compacta; cerebellar vermis; pars reticulata; subthalamic nucleus / Top expressed in: ciliary body; habenula; secondary oocyte; zygote; utricle; epithelium of lens; iris; Rostral migratory stream; retinal pigment epithelium; vestibular membrane of cochlear duct; More reference expression data
BioGPS	More reference expression data
Gene ontology
Molecular function	transferase activity; nucleotide binding; protein serine/threonine/tyrosine kinase activity; protein tyrosine kinase activity; protein kinase activity; ATP binding; kinase activity; protein serine/threonine kinase activity
Cellular component	cytoplasm; cell junction; plasma membrane; basolateral plasma membrane; apical plasma membrane; membrane; cytosol
Biological process	positive regulation of fibroblast growth factor receptor signaling pathway; positive regulation of kinase activity; peptidyl-tyrosine phosphorylation; protein phosphorylation; cellular response to fibroblast growth factor stimulus; phosphorylation; positive regulation of ERK1 and ERK2 cascade; negative regulation of apoptotic process
Sources:Amigo / QuickGO
Orthologs
Databases	NCBI: entry; OMA: entry
Species	Human	Mouse
Entrez	25778	213452
Ensembl	ENSG00000133059	ENSMUSG00000042046
UniProt	Q6XUX3	Q6XUX1
RefSeq (mRNA)	NM_015375; NM_199462	NM_172516
RefSeq (protein)	NP_056190; NP_955749	NP_766104
Location (UCSC)	Chr 1: 205.14 – 205.21 Mb	Chr 1: 132.35 – 132.39 Mb
PubMed search
- Wikidata
View/Edit Human	View/Edit Mouse

Dual serine/threonine and tyrosine protein kinase is an enzyme that in humans is encoded by the DSTYK gene.

This protein is also known as the Dusty protein kinase and the Receptor interacting protein 5 (RIP5).

This gene encodes a dual-specificity kinase which is expressed in multiple tissues. Multiple alternatively spliced transcript variants have been found, but the biological validity of some variants has not been determined.

In melanocytic cells RIPK5 gene expression may be regulated by MITF.

Mutations in this gene have been associated with hereditary spastic paraplegia type 23.

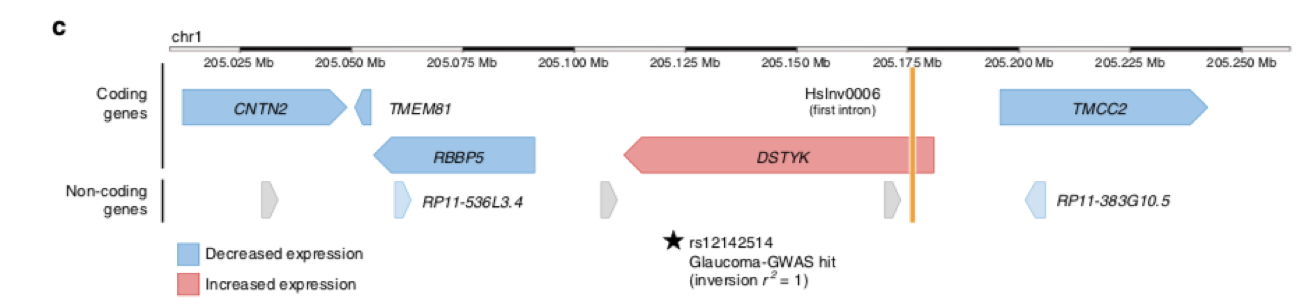
"Diagram of HsInv0006 (orange bar) genomic region showing the effect of the inverted allele on the expression of neighboring genes in different tissues according to the GTEx data and the inversion tag SNP in Europeans associated to increased risk of Glaucoma"

It has also seen that DSTYK deletion causes pigmentation problems and high cell death after ultraviolet irradiation. In a study conducted by Giner-Delgado, Carla, et al. it has been observed that the inversion of the first intron has been associated with changes in expression in the proximal genes and with an increase in the expression of DSTKY itself. Due to the deleterious effect caused by the absence of expression, the positive selection of this investment could explain its increase in the African population. They also noted that the investment has been linked to an increased risk of glaucoma in Europeans (which again shows the possible positive selection, since glaucoma is more common and severe in individuals of African descent.
