= Jim Mansfield =

Irish businessman

James Mansfield, Sr.
- Born: 9 April 1939; Brittas, County Dublin, Ireland
- Died: 29 January 2014 (aged 74); Saggart, County Dublin, Ireland
- Occupation: Importer
- Known for: Property development
- Children: 3

James Mansfield Sr. (9 April 1939 – 29 January 2014) was an Irish property developer and millionaire with a property portfolio that included the Citywest Hotel and Golf Resort, several developments local to the Saggart, Citywest and Tallaght areas, and Weston Airport.

Mansfield had been involved in high-profile disputes over planning permission for his developments. By 2011, Mansfield's companies' debts could not be serviced, and his commercial properties passed to the National Asset Management Agency.

== Early life ==
Mansfield was born on 9 April 1939 and was raised in Brittas, County Dublin. He left school, initially buying a lorry and working in the haulage business, then later renting or selling lorries to contractors. He allegedly made his fortune selling machinery left over from the Falklands war. It was from this industry that Mansfield expanded his business empire to include the Mansfield Group and HSS Ltd.

== Business career ==
Mansfield's assets grew in the 1980s, according to a 2003 report in the Sunday Business Post, upon selling 100,000 tonnes of machinery, including some 1,100 earth-movers, which had been left over from the Falklands War between Britain and Argentina, for an estimated £100 million STG. The Irish Times estimated the profit at £19 million in the US and a further £7 million in the UK.

Mansfield realised that land was going up in value in Ireland in the early 1990s, and he successfully secured several thousand acres in and near Saggart, County Dublin, as well as other small pockets of land throughout Dublin. As property demand rose, so did the land value, and he successfully turned over his land assets. Mansfield's Citywest Hotel was built from scratch and established as the venue for the annual Fianna Fáil Ardfheis and for GAA functions. He carried on dealing in his machinery trade, which once again added to his wealth, amounting to a reputed €200 million, as of a 21 February 2010 report in the Irish edition of the Sunday Times.

In 1999 he bought Palmerstown House, an estate near Johnstown, County Kildare, from Anne Moen Bullitt for IR£10million (€12.7million). In 2000 he purchased the Weston Aerodrome, a €13 million airfield to the south west of Dublin. He expanded the airfield to include a flight training facility but without full planning permission. In 2007 Mansfield's Citywest group bought the Finnstown Countryhouse Hotel and the property's surrounding 45 acres in Lucan, Dublin for an estimated €50 million.

As of 2005 his wealth was estimated by Estates Gazette to be £264 million STG. In a 2006 interview with the Sunday Business Post, Mansfield claimed that his net worth had been independently valued at 1.6 billion euros.

=== Receivership ===
Following the collapse of the Irish property bubble in the late 2000s, Mansfield had the main part of his empire, the Citywest Hotel complex, placed into receivership in 2010. The Bank of Scotland (Ireland) took steps to recover €170m loaned to two companies. On 20 April 2011, the National Asset Management Agency seized the last of the major assets in Mansfield's property empire. Apart from Weston Airport, also seized were six of his apartment blocks at Citywest and Saggart and at Palmerstown House Estate, which includes a championship golf course.

== Personal life ==
Jim Mansfield and his wife Anne had three sons, Tony, Jimmy and P.J.

Mansfield suffered from multiple system atrophy (MSA), a rare condition that causes symptoms similar to Parkinson's disease. He died on 29 January 2014, aged 74, and was survived by his wife and their sons.
