= DYRK1A =

Protein-coding gene in the species Homo sapiens

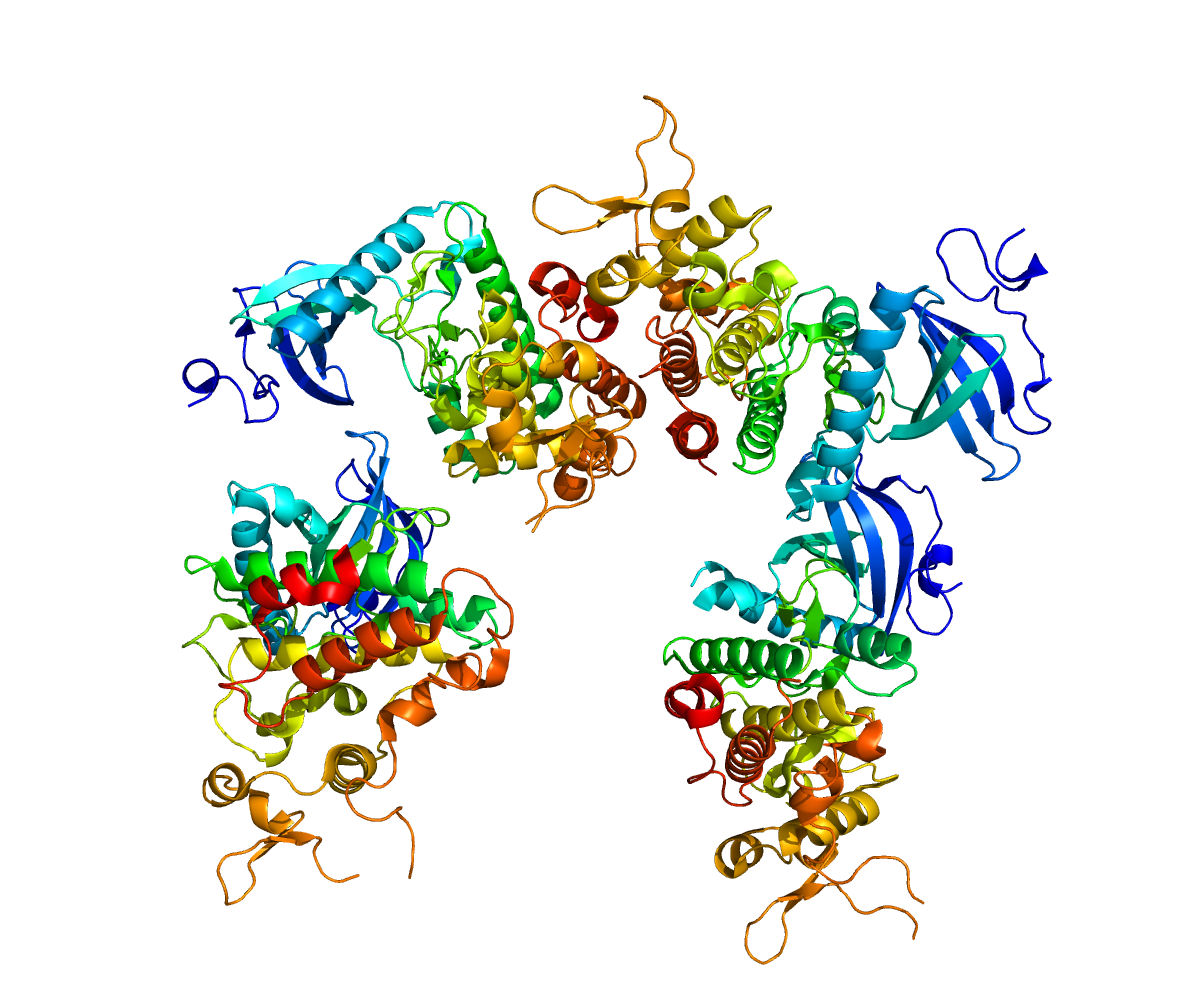

Identifiers
- Aliases: DYRK1A, DYRK, DYRK1, HP86, MNB, MNBH, MRD7, dual specificity tyrosine phosphorylation regulated kinase 1A
- External IDs: OMIM: 600855; MGI: 1330299; GeneCards: DYRK1A
Available structures
PDB	Ortholog search: PDBe RCSB
PDB	List of PDB id codes 2VX3, 2WO6, 3ANQ, 3ANR, 4AZE, 4MQ1, 4MQ2, 4NCT, 4YLJ, 4YLK, 4YLL, 4YU2, 5AIK, 5A4Q, 5A4E, 5A3X, 5A4T, 5A54, 5A4L
Enzyme activity
EC #	BRENDA	ExPASy	KEGG	MetaCyc
2.7.11.23	↗	↗	↗	↗
2.7.12.1	↗	↗	↗	↗

Gene location (Human)
Chr.	Chromosome 21 (human)
Band	21q22.13	Start	37,365,573 bp
Band	21q22.13	End	37,526,358 bp

Gene location (Mouse)
Chr.	Chromosome 16 (mouse)
Band	16 C4|16 55.3 cM	Start	94,370,869 bp
Band	16 C4|16 55.3 cM	End	94,496,376 bp
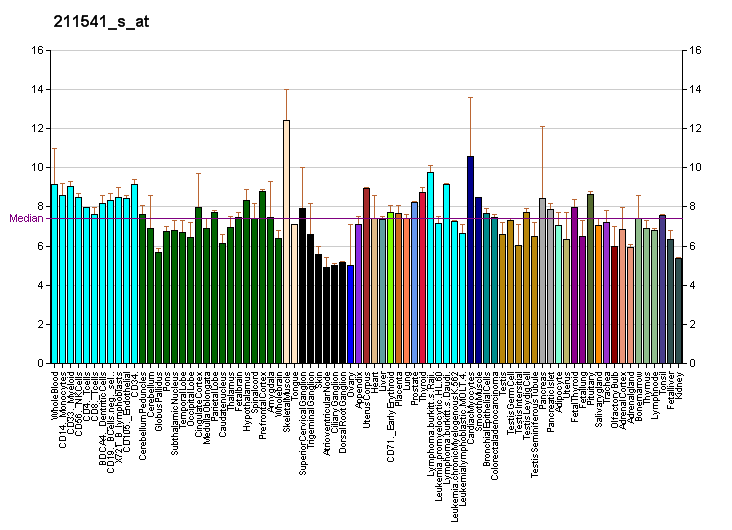

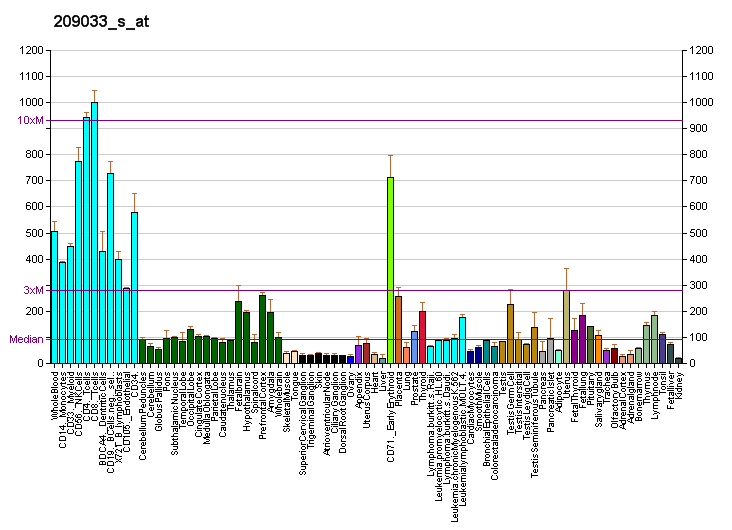

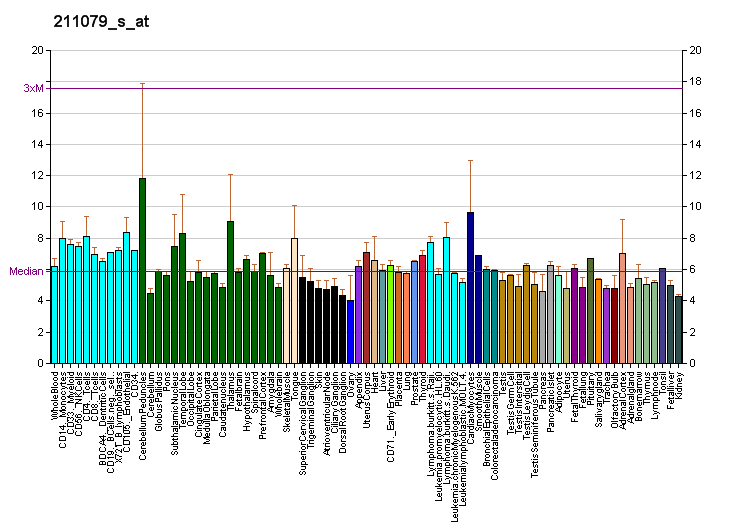
RNA expression pattern
Bgee	Human / Mouse (ortholog); Top expressed in: amniotic fluid; biceps brachii; Brodmann area 23; Skeletal muscle tissue of biceps brachii; bronchial epithelial cell; tibialis anterior muscle; middle temporal gyrus; germinal epithelium; visceral pleura; trabecular bone / Top expressed in: zygote; cardiac muscle tissue of left ventricle; muscle of thigh; Gonadal ridge; secondary oocyte; tail of embryo; genital tubercle; extensor digitorum longus muscle; triceps surae; gastrocnemius muscle; More reference expression data
BioGPS	More reference expression data
Gene ontology
Molecular function	transferase activity; protein kinase activity; nucleotide binding; non-membrane spanning protein tyrosine kinase activity; kinase activity; protein self-association; protein serine/threonine kinase activity; protein binding; protein serine/threonine/tyrosine kinase activity; protein tyrosine kinase activity; tau protein binding; ATP binding; identical protein binding; tau-protein kinase activity
Cellular component	nuclear speck; nucleoplasm; nucleus; cytoplasm; cytoskeleton; axon; dendrite; ribonucleoprotein complex
Biological process	positive regulation of protein deacetylation; phosphorylation; regulation of alternative mRNA splicing, via spliceosome; nervous system development; protein phosphorylation; negative regulation of mRNA splicing, via spliceosome; negative regulation of DNA damage response, signal transduction by p53 class mediator; peptidyl-serine phosphorylation; circadian rhythm; protein autophosphorylation; peptidyl-tyrosine phosphorylation; peptidyl-threonine phosphorylation; viral process; negative regulation of microtubule polymerization; positive regulation of RNA splicing; amyloid-beta formation; peptidyl-serine autophosphorylation; peptidyl-tyrosine autophosphorylation
Sources:Amigo / QuickGO
Orthologs
Databases	NCBI: entry; OMA: entry
Species	Human	Mouse
Entrez	1859	13548
Ensembl	ENSG00000157540	ENSMUSG00000022897
UniProt	Q13627	Q61214
RefSeq (mRNA)	NM_001396; NM_101395; NM_130436; NM_130437; NM_130438 NM_001347721; NM_001347722; NM_001347723	NM_001113389; NM_007890; NM_001347731
RefSeq (protein)	NP_001334650; NP_001334651; NP_001334652; NP_001387; NP_567824 NP_569120; NP_569122	NP_001106860; NP_001334660; NP_031916; NP_001389720; NP_001389721 NP_001389722
Location (UCSC)	Chr 21: 37.37 – 37.53 Mb	Chr 16: 94.37 – 94.5 Mb
PubMed search
- Wikidata
View/Edit Human	View/Edit Mouse

Dual specificity tyrosine-phosphorylation-regulated kinase 1A is an enzyme that in humans is encoded by the DYRK1A gene. Alternative splicing of this gene generates several transcript variants differing from each other either in the 5' UTR or in the 3' coding region. These variants encode for at least five different isoforms.

== Function ==
DYRK1A is a member of the dual-specificity tyrosine phosphorylation-regulated kinase (DYRK) family. This member contains a nuclear targeting signal sequence, a protein kinase domain, a leucine zipper motif, and a highly conservative 13-consecutive-histidine repeat. It catalyzes its autophosphorylation on serine/threonine and tyrosine residues. It may play a significant role in a signaling pathway regulating cell proliferation and may be involved in brain development. This gene is a homolog of the Drosophila mnb (minibrain) gene.

DYRK1A has also been shown to modulate plasma homocysteine levels in a mouse model of overexpression.

== Clinical significance ==
DYRK1A is localized in the Down syndrome critical region of chromosome 21, and is considered to be a strong candidate gene for learning defects associated with Down syndrome. In addition, a polymorphism (SNP) in DYRK1A was found to be associated with HIV-1 replication in monocyte-derived macrophages, as well as with slower progression to AIDS in two independent cohorts of HIV-1-infected individuals. Mutations in DYRK1A are also associated with autism spectrum disorder.

== Interactions ==
DYRK1A has been shown to interact with DCAF7.

== In popular culture ==
Rosie, the learning-disabled protagonist of BBC sitcom There She Goes, has DYRK1A syndrome, as revealed in the show's final episode.

== See also ==
- DYRK1B
- DYRK2
- DYRK3
