= DYRK1B =

Protein-coding gene in the species Homo sapiens

Identifiers
- Aliases: DYRK1B, AOMS3, MIRK, dual specificity tyrosine phosphorylation regulated kinase 1B
- External IDs: OMIM: 604556; MGI: 1330302; GeneCards: DYRK1B
Enzyme activity
EC #	BRENDA	ExPASy	KEGG	MetaCyc
2.7.12.1	↗	↗	↗	↗

Gene location (Human)
Chr.	Chromosome 19 (human)
Band	19q13.2	Start	39,825,350 bp
Band	19q13.2	End	39,834,201 bp

Gene location (Mouse)
Chr.	Chromosome 7 (mouse)
Band	7|7 A3	Start	27,878,894 bp
Band	7|7 A3	End	27,886,719 bp
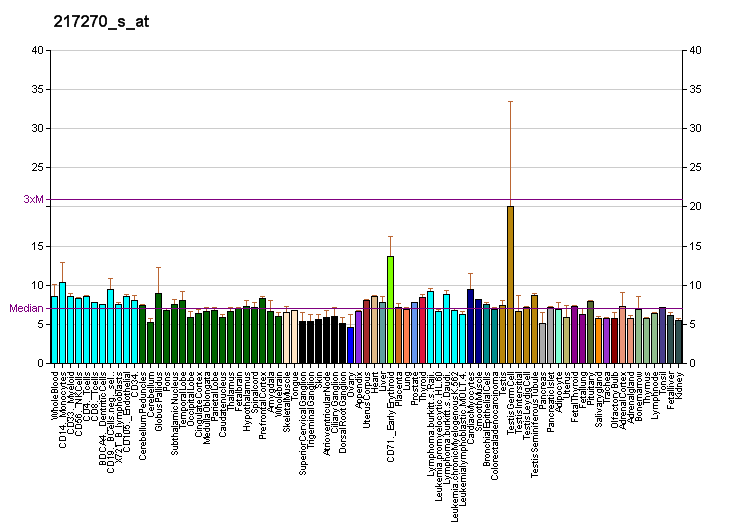

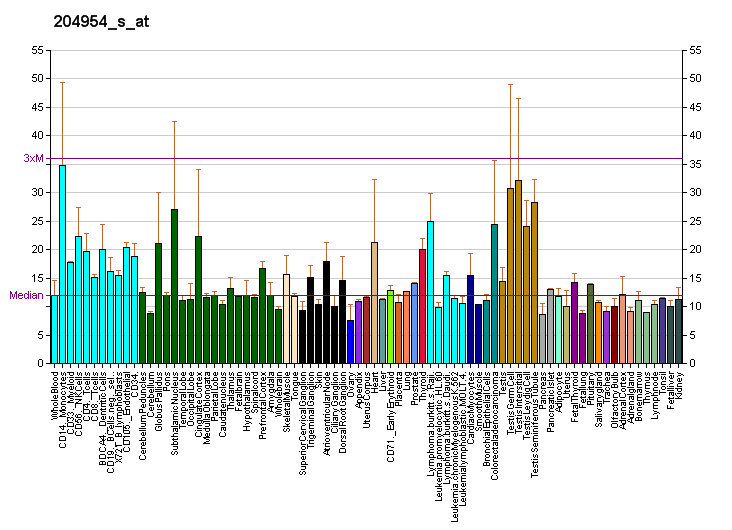
RNA expression pattern
Bgee	Human / Mouse (ortholog); Top expressed in: muscle of thigh; skeletal muscle tissue; right testis; left testis; gastrocnemius muscle; right uterine tube; pituitary gland; right adrenal gland; anterior pituitary; right adrenal cortex / Top expressed in: spermatid; muscle of thigh; spermatocyte; seminiferous tubule; neural layer of retina; genital tubercle; lip; superior frontal gyrus; skeletal muscle tissue; granulocyte; More reference expression data
BioGPS	More reference expression data
Gene ontology
Molecular function	transferase activity; protein kinase activity; transcription coactivator activity; protein serine/threonine/tyrosine kinase activity; protein serine/threonine kinase activity; protein tyrosine kinase activity; nucleotide binding; protein binding; ATP binding; kinase activity
Cellular component	nucleus
Biological process	positive regulation of transcription, DNA-templated; protein phosphorylation; peptidyl-tyrosine phosphorylation; myoblast fusion; adipose tissue development; phosphorylation; protein autophosphorylation
Sources:Amigo / QuickGO
Orthologs
Databases	NCBI: entry; OMA: entry
Species	Human	Mouse
Entrez	9149	13549
Ensembl	ENSG00000105204; ENSG00000281320	ENSMUSG00000002409
UniProt	Q9Y463	Q9Z188
RefSeq (mRNA)	NM_004714; NM_006483; NM_006484	NM_001037957; NM_001271370; NM_010092
RefSeq (protein)	NP_004705; NP_006474; NP_006475; NP_004705.1	NP_001033046; NP_001258299; NP_034222
Location (UCSC)	Chr 19: 39.83 – 39.83 Mb	Chr 7: 27.88 – 27.89 Mb
PubMed search
- Wikidata
View/Edit Human	View/Edit Mouse

Dual specificity tyrosine-phosphorylation-regulated kinase 1B is an enzyme that in humans is encoded by the DYRK1B gene.

== Function ==
DYRK1B is a member of the DYRK family of protein kinases. DYRK1B contains a bipartite nuclear localization signal and is found mainly in muscle and testis. The protein is proposed to be involved in the regulation of nuclear functions. Three isoforms of DYRK1B have been identified differing in the presence of two alternatively spliced exons within the catalytic domain.

== Interactions ==
DYRK1B has been shown to interact with:

- PCBD1 and
- RANBP9.

== Clinical significance ==
One lone missense mutation in Dyrk1B gene (R102C) was found associated with an autosomal dominant early onset Coronary Artery Disease, juvenile-onset truncal obesity, severe hypertension, and type II diabetes mellitus - seen in subjects from a nomadic group in Iran.

== Inhibitors ==
CBL-514 is a DYRK1B inhibitor which is under development for the treatment of subcutaneous fat disorders and obesity.

== See also ==
- DYRK1A
- DYRK2
