= Adiposis dolorosa =

- Other names: Anders disease
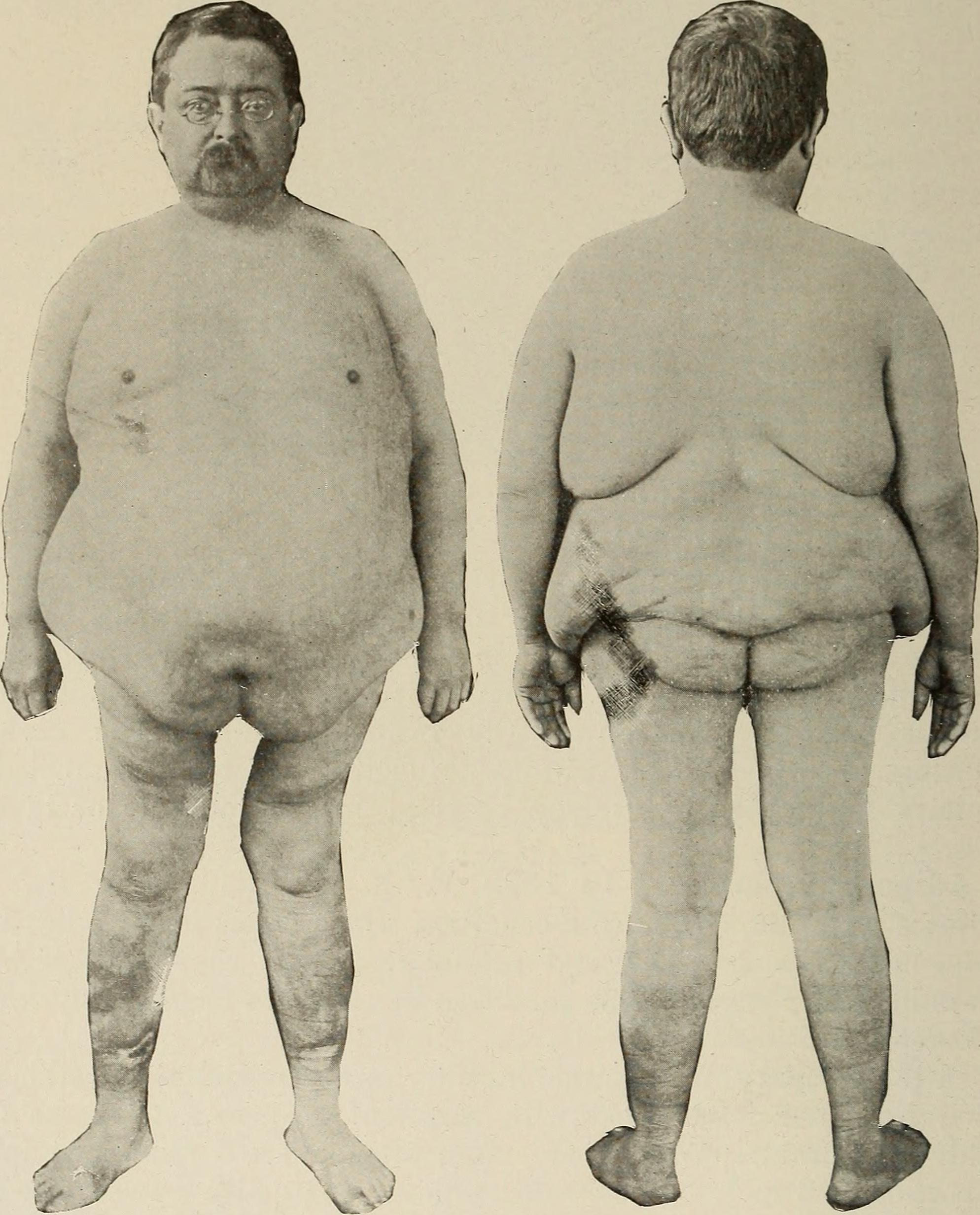
- Adiposis dolorosa of the diffuse truncal form (Dercum). The anterior view shows the peculiar apron of fat and the small size of the hands. The posterior view shows the arrangement of fat in folds over the hips.
- Specialty: Endocrinology

Adiposis dolorosa is an outdated term for many years used synonymously as Dercum's disease, lipedema or Anders disease. While there are numerous references to adiposis dolorosa, it is recommended that the term no longer be used. Dercum's is now recognized as a separate condition, as is lipedema.
