= Dercum's disease =

Medical condition

- Other names: Adiposis dolorosa
- Specialty: Endocrinology, Dermatology
- Symptoms: Painful fatty tumors in extremities
- Usual onset: 35–50 years of age
- Causes: Unknown
- Risk factors: Obesity, female sex
- Diagnostic method: Physical examination
- Treatment: Analgesics, surgery
- Frequency: Rare

Dercum's disease (DD) is a rare condition characterized by multiple painful fatty tumors, called lipomas, that can grow anywhere in subcutaneous fat across the body.

The onset of Dercum's disease can be rapid or insidious and progressive, beginning most often in the third decade. Obesity and rapid weight gain is common in DD, with chronic fatigue and pain unresponsive to analgesics. Pain associated with Dercum’s disease can often be severe and may be caused by lipomas pressing on nearby nerves or inflamed connective tissue, also called fascia, which is commonly associated with the lipomas.

The cause and mechanism of Dercum's disease remains unknown. Possible causes include genetics (autosomal dominant inheritance), trauma, nervous system dysfunction, disturbances in endocrine system and metabolism of fat, or it may be an autoimmune disorder. Some cases of Dercum's may occur in one or more people in a family with familial multiple lipomatosis. Although surgical resection or liposuction improves pain, regrowths occur in 50% cases. DD mainly occurs in adults of ages 35–50 years and more women are affected than men.

The disease was described for the first time by an American neurologist Francis Xavier Dercum, who headed the University of Pennsylvania’s Neurological Clinic and was the personal physician to U.S. president Woodrow Wilson. He published two papers on the disease in 1888 and 1892, and he used the term “adiposis dolorosa”. Further, the disease was reported also in Philadelphia by the American physician James Meschter Anders (1854–1936) and the British physician and medical biographer at Guy’s Hospital in London, William Hale White (1857–1949). In the past, Dercum's was considered synonymous with Lipedema, but it is now regarded as a separate condition. It has been recognized by the World Health Organization in ICD-10. Orphanet and the National Organization of Rare Disorders also listed the disease.

== Signs and symptoms ==
Four cardinal symptoms have sometimes been used as diagnostic criteria:

- painful, fatty lipomas (benign fatty tumors) across anatomy
- obesity, frequently in menopausal age
- weakness and fatigue
- emotional instability, depression, epilepsy, confusion and dementia.

Other potential signs of the disease include:

- being bruised easily
- trouble with sleeping
- memory issues
- elevated heart rate
- difficulty with concentration
- joint aches
- shortness of breath

However, as it is unclear which symptoms are cardinal and which symptoms are minor signs in Dercum's disease, it is unclear which should be used as diagnostic criteria. Researchers have proposed a 'minimal definition' based on symptoms most often part of Dercum's disease: 1) Generalized overweight or obesity. 2) Chronic pain in the adipose tissue. The associated symptoms in Dercum's disease include obesity, fatty deposits, easy bruisability, sleep disturbances, impaired memory, depression, difficulty concentrating, anxiety, rapid heartbeat, shortness of breath, diabetes, bloating, constipation, fatigue, weakness, and joint and muscle aches. Regarding the associated symptoms in Dercum's disease, only case reports have been published. No study involving medical examinations has been performed in a large group of patients.

== Causes ==
There are no currently known causes of this disease. There are studies currently proposing several theories of the causes which include inflammation of the adipose tissue, nervous system malfunction and endocrine malfunction. None of the theories that are currently proposed have been found viable. Since little is known about Dercum's disease, there are currently no known modes of prevention.

== Diagnosis ==
Diagnosis of Dercum's disease is done through a physical examination. In order to properly diagnose the patient, the doctor must first exclude all other possible differential diagnoses. The basic criteria for Dercum's disease are patients with chronic pain in the adipose tissue (body fat) and patients who are also obese. Although rare, the diagnosis may not include obesity. Dercum's disease can also be inherited and a family medical history may aid in the diagnosis of this disease. There are no specific laboratory test for this disease. Ultrasound and magnetic resonance imaging can play a role in diagnosis.

== Treatment ==
Common treatments for Dercum's disease is directed towards treating the individual symptoms. Pain relief medication may be administered to temporarily reduce the discomfort in the patient. Cortisone shots have also been shown to be effective in temporarily reducing the chronic pain. Surgical removal of the damaged adipose tissue can be effective, but often the disease will recur.

Few convincing large studies on the treatment of Dercum's disease have been conducted. Most of the different treatment strategies that exist are based on case reports. Currently, there is a lack of scientific data on the use of integrative therapies for the treatment or prevention of Dercum's disease. Not enough studies have been done to substantiate that diet and supplements could help with the disease.

=== Surgery ===
Surgical excision of fatty tissue deposits around joints (liposuction) has been used in some cases. Liposuction may temporarily relieve symptoms although recurrences often develop.

=== Medication ===
Traditional analgesics

The pain in Dercum's disease is often reported to be refractory to analgesics and to non-steroidal anti-inflammatory drugs (NSAIDs). However, this has been contradicted by the findings of Herbst et al. They reported that the pain diminished in 89% of patients (n=89) when treated with NSAIDs and in 97% of patients when treated with narcotic analgesics (n=37). The dosage required and the duration of the pain relief are not precisely stated in the article.

==== Lidocaine ====
An early report from 1934 showed that intralesional injections of procaine (Novocain) relieved pain in six cases. More recently, other types of local treatment of painful sites with lidocaine patches (5%) (Lidoderm) or lidocaine/prilocaine (25 mg/25 mg) cream (EMLA®) have shown a reduction of pain in a few cases.

In the 1980s, treatment with intravenous infusions of lidocaine (Xylocaine) in varying doses was reported in nine patients. The resulting pain relief lasted from 10 hours to 12 months. In five of the cases, the lidocaine treatment was combined with mexiletine (Mexitil®), which is a class 1B anti-arrhythmic with similar pharmacological properties as lidocaine. The mechanism by which lidocaine reduces pain in Dercum's disease is unclear. It may block impulse conduction in peripheral nerves, and thereby disconnect abnormal nervous impulse circuits. Nonetheless, it might also depress cerebral activity that could lead to increased pain thresholds. Iwane et al. performed an EEG during the administration of intravenous lidocaine. The EEG showed slow waves appearing 7 minutes after the start of the infusion and disappearing within 20 minutes after the end of the infusion. On the other hand, the pain relief effect was the greatest at about 20 minutes after the end of the infusion.

Based on this, the authors concluded that the effect of lidocaine on peripheral nerves most likely explains why the drug has an effect on pain in Dercum's disease. In contrast, Atkinson et al. have suggested that an effect on the central nervous system is more likely, as lidocaine can depress consciousness and decrease cerebral metabolism. In addition, Skagen et al. demonstrated that a patient with Dercum's disease lacked the vasoconstrictor response to arm and leg lowering, which indicated that the sympathicusmediated local veno-arteriolar reflex was absent. This could suggest increased sympathetic activity. An infusion of lidocaine increased blood flow in subcutaneous tissue and normalised the vasoconstrictor response when the limbs were lowered. The authors suggested that the pain relief was caused by a normalisation of up-regulated sympathetic activity.

==== Methotrexate and infliximab ====
One patient's symptoms were improved with methotrexate and infliximab. However, in another patient with Dercum's disease, the effect of methotrexate was discreet. The mechanism of action is unclear. Previously, methotrexate has been shown to reduce neuropathic pain caused by peripheral nerve injury in a study on rats. The mechanism in the rat study case was thought to be a decrease in microglial activation subsequent to nerve injury. Furthermore, a study has shown that infliximab reduces neuropathic pain in patients with central nervous system sarcoidosis. The mechanism is thought to be mediated by tumour necrosis factor inhibition.

==== Interferon α-2b ====
Two patients were successfully treated with interferon α-2b. The authors speculated on whether the mechanism could be the antiviral effect of the drug, the production of endogenous substances, such as endorphins, or interference with the production of interleukin-1 and tumour necrosis factor. Interleukin-1 and tumour necrosis factor are involved in cutaneous hyperalgesia.

==== Corticosteroids ====
A few patients noted some improvement when treated with systemic corticosteroids (e.g., prednisolone), whereas others experienced worsening of the pain. Weinberg et al. treated two patients with juxta-articular Dercum's disease with intralesional injections of methylprednisolone (Depo-Medrol). The patients experienced a dramatic improvement. The mechanism for the pain-reducing ability of corticosteroids in some conditions is unknown. One theory is that they inhibit the effects of substances such as histamine, serotonin, bradykinin, and prostaglandins. As the aetiology of Dercum's disease is probably not inflammatory, it is plausible that the improvement some of the patients experience when using corticosteroids is not caused by an anti-inflammatory effect.

=== Alternative treatment ===
CVAC sessions

Cyclic Variations in Adaptive Conditioning (CVAC) is a method of touch-free cyclic hypobaric pneumatic compression for treatment of tissue edema and, therefore, edema-associated pain. As a pilot study, 10 participants with AD completed pain and quality of life questionnaires before and after 20–40 minutes of CVAC process daily for 5 days. After treatment, there was a significant decrease in pain as measured by the Pain Catastrophizing Scale and the Visual Analogue Scale, but there was no change in pain quality by the McGill Pain Questionnaire. However, there were no changes in the Pain Disability Index or Pittsburgh Sleep Quality Index. This study suggests a potential treatment role for CVAC, and the authors recommended randomized controlled clinical trials.

== Epidemiology ==
Dercum's disease most commonly appears between the ages of 35 and 50 years of age. It is five to thirty times more common in women than in men. Originally, Dercum proposed that the condition mainly affects postmenopausal women. However, a 2007 survey has revealed that 85.7 percent of the included patients developed Dercum's disease before menopause. The prevalence of Dercum's disease has not yet been exactly established.
