= DYRK2 =

Protein-coding gene in humans

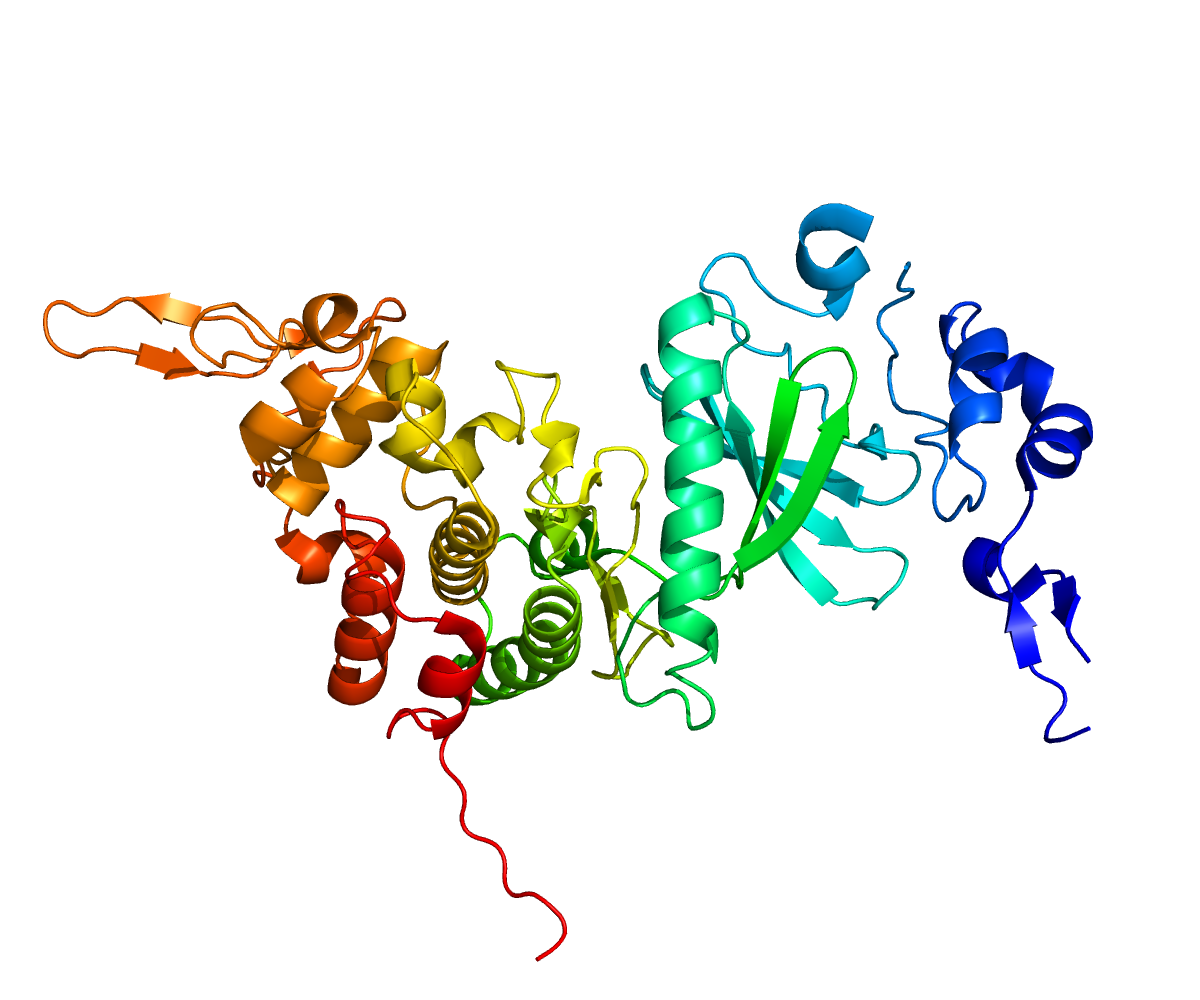
Available structures
PDB	Ortholog search: PDBe RCSB
PDB	List of PDB id codes 3K2L, 3KVW, 4AZF

Identifiers
- Aliases: DYRK2, dual specificity tyrosine phosphorylation regulated kinase 2
- External IDs: OMIM: 603496; MGI: 1330301; HomoloGene: 48437; GeneCards: DYRK2; OMA:DYRK2 - orthologs

Gene location (Human)
Chr.	Chromosome 12 (human)
Band	12q15	Start	67,648,338 bp
Band	12q15	End	67,665,406 bp

Gene location (Mouse)
Chr.	Chromosome 10 (mouse)
Band	10|10 D2	Start	118,691,508 bp
Band	10|10 D2	End	118,706,114 bp
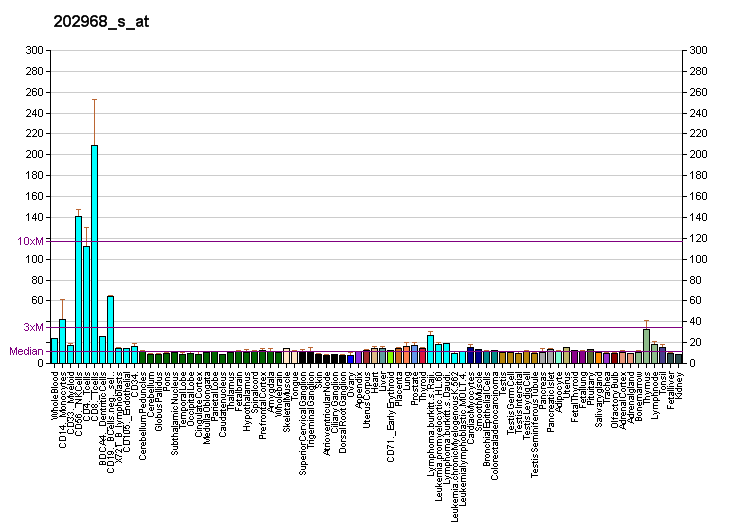

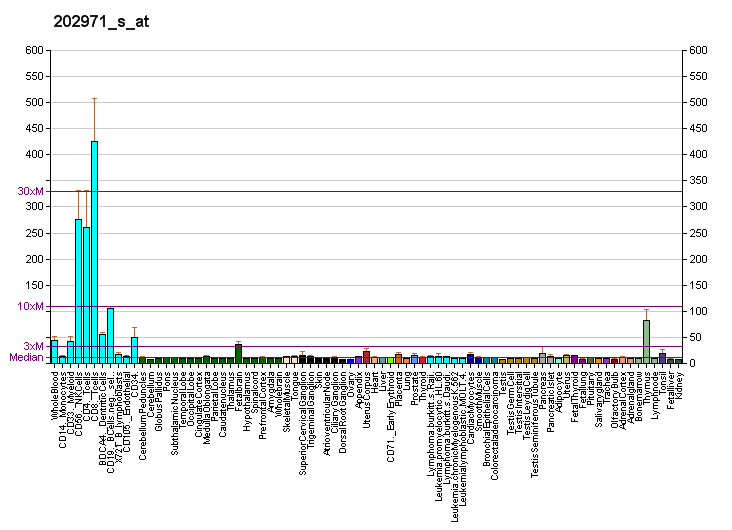
RNA expression pattern
Bgee	Human / Mouse (ortholog); Top expressed in: jejunal mucosa; mucosa of sigmoid colon; Skeletal muscle tissue of rectus abdominis; vastus lateralis muscle; pylorus; biceps brachii; Skeletal muscle tissue of biceps brachii; visceral pleura; right ventricle; hair follicle / Top expressed in: otolith organ; utricle; epithelium of lens; hand; knee joint; retinal pigment epithelium; left colon; hair follicle; digastric muscle; sternocleidomastoid muscle; More reference expression data
BioGPS	More reference expression data
Gene ontology
Molecular function	transferase activity; nucleotide binding; protein kinase activity; manganese ion binding; kinase activity; protein binding; protein serine/threonine/tyrosine kinase activity; protein tyrosine kinase activity; ATP binding; magnesium ion binding; protein serine/threonine kinase activity
Cellular component	cytoplasm; ubiquitin ligase complex; nucleus; nucleoplasm; cytosol; ribonucleoprotein complex
Biological process	intrinsic apoptotic signaling pathway in response to DNA damage by p53 class mediator; positive regulation of glycogen biosynthetic process; phosphorylation; cellular response to DNA damage stimulus; protein phosphorylation; smoothened signaling pathway; apoptotic process; regulation of signal transduction by p53 class mediator; peptidyl-tyrosine phosphorylation; negative regulation of calcineurin-NFAT signaling cascade
Sources:Amigo / QuickGO
Orthologs
Species	Human	Mouse
Entrez	8445	69181
Ensembl	ENSG00000127334	ENSMUSG00000028630
UniProt	Q92630	Q5U4C9
RefSeq (mRNA)	NM_006482; NM_003583	NM_001014390
RefSeq (protein)	NP_003574; NP_006473	NP_001014412
Location (UCSC)	Chr 12: 67.65 – 67.67 Mb	Chr 10: 118.69 – 118.71 Mb
PubMed search
- Wikidata
View/Edit Human	View/Edit Mouse

Dual specificity tyrosine-phosphorylation-regulated kinase 2 is an enzyme, in particular a dual-specificity kinase, that in humans is encoded by the DYRK2 gene.

DYRK2 belongs to a family of protein kinases whose members are presumed to be involved in cellular growth and development. The family is defined by structural similarity of their kinase domains and their capability to autophosphorylate on tyrosine residues. DYRK2 has demonstrated tyrosine autophosphorylation and catalyzed phosphorylation of histones H3 and H2B in vitro. Two isoforms of DYRK2 have been isolated. The predominant isoform, isoform 1, lacks a 5' terminal insert.

== See also ==
- DYRK1A
