= Lipedema =

Medical condition of fat deposits

- Other names: Lipoedema, lipödem, lipalgia, adiposalgia, adipoalgesia, adiposis dolorosa, lipomatosis dolorosa of the legs, lipohypertrophy dolorosa, painful column leg, painful lipedema syndrome
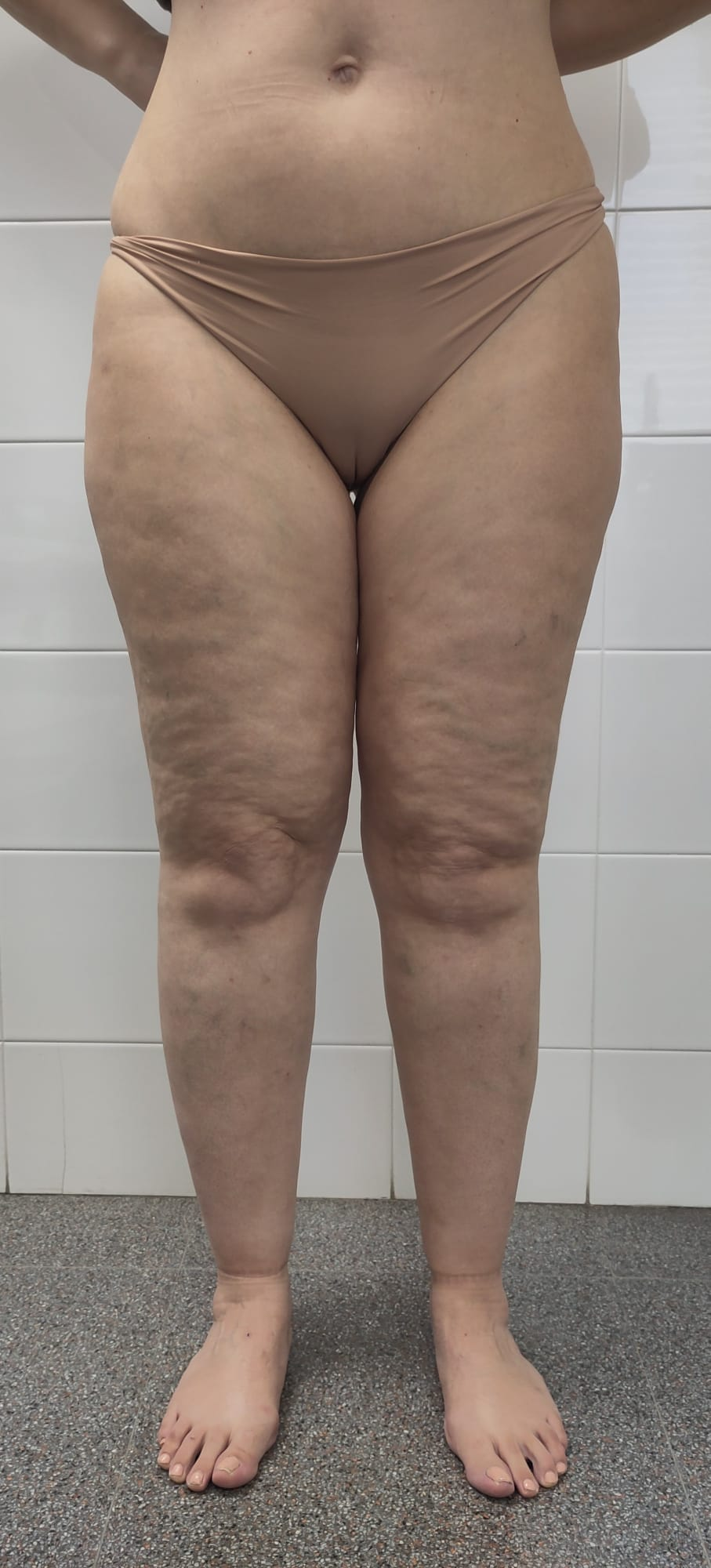
- Lipedema, type III, stage 1.
- Specialty: Vascular medicine
- Symptoms: Increased fat deposits under the skin in the legs, increased extracellular fluid, inflammation, easy bruising, pain
- Causes: Unknown
- Risk factors: Family member with the condition
- Differential diagnosis: Lipohypertrophy, chronic venous insufficiency, lymphedema
- Treatment: Physiotherapy, exercise compression stockings, emollients, liposuction
- Frequency: Up to 11% of women

Lipedema is a chronic medical condition that is almost exclusively found in women and results in enlargement of both legs due to deposits of fat under the skin. It is characterized by bilateral, symmetrical buildup of fat in the legs, and sometimes arms and lower trunk (includes hips, buttocks, and abdomen). Women of any weight may be affected and the fat is resistant to traditional weight-loss methods like nutritional intervention, exercise, elevation, diuretics or bariatric surgery.

The feet/hands are typically spared, presenting with a raised ridge or fold of fat, possibly a "cuff" at the wrists and ankles. In earlier stages, there may be a subtle, raised ridge or fold of fat instead of distinct cuffing and sometimes in the later stages, this increased adipose above the ankle/wrist can cause the appearance of a "cuff".

Approximately 50% of people with lipedema report pain in their fat. Other common symptoms include swelling, feelings of heaviness, and easy bruising in the affected areas. Over time mobility may be reduced, and due to reduced quality of life, people often experience depression.

The cause of lipedema is unknown but is believed to involve genetic and hormonal factors. Lipedema onset is typically associated with periods of hormonal flux such as during puberty, pregnancy, or menopause, and it often runs in families. Other conditions that may present similarly include lipohypertrophy, chronic venous insufficiency, and lymphedema. It is commonly misdiagnosed.

Lipedema is resistant to traditional weight loss methods; however, unlike other types of fat, it is not associated with an increased risk of diabetes or cardiovascular disease. Physiotherapy may help to preserve mobility. Exercise will help with overall fitness but will not prevent the progression of the disease. Compression stockings can help with pain and make walking easier. Regularly moisturizing with emollients protects the skin and prevents it from drying out. Liposuction can help if the symptoms are particularly severe. While surgery can remove fat tissue, it can also damage lymphatic vessels. Treatment does not typically result in complete resolution. Lipedema is estimated to affect up to 11% of women.

== Signs and symptoms ==
=== Common presentation ===
Common characteristics include:

- Almost exclusively affects women.
- Starts or worsens at times of hormonal changes: puberty, pregnancy, or menopause.
- Bilateral, symmetrical buildup of fat in the legs, and sometimes arms and lower trunk, that is resistant to nutritional intervention, exercise, elevation, diuretics, and bariatric surgery.
- Feet and hands are typically spared, presenting with a raised ridge or fold of fat. In earlier stages, there may be a subtle, raised ridge or fold of fat instead of distinct cuffing to the ankle or wrist. Sometimes, especially in later stages, this increased adipose tissue above the ankle/wrist can cause the appearance of a “cuff”. The evocative term “pantaloons” is sometimes used to describe this morphology in its later stages.
- Presence of nodular and/or fibrotic texture beneath the skin, which can create an uneven, dimpled appearance.
- Complaints of pain, tenderness, and/or heaviness in affected areas.
- Fatigue, brain fog, easy bruising.
- Edema and joint hypermobility may also be present.
- Texture and visual presentation may change with swelling and inflammation.

=== Associated conditions and common co-morbidities ===
- Obesity: Lipedema is often confused with obesity because of increased adipose tissue deposition. If obesity is present as a comorbidity, it can complicate lipedema diagnosis because there may be no presentation of disproportion between the upper and lower body.
- Lymphedema: Lipedema is often confused with lymphedema because of enlargement of the limbs and patient complaints of heaviness, swelling, and difficulty with mobility.
- Chronic venous insufficiency (CVI): People with lipedema may present with increased varicosities and CVI. Assessment for vascular health is important to determine if a patient requires interventions like venous ablations, or resolution of a deep vein thrombosis, especially if the patient is considering liposuction or "lifts".
- Hypermobile Ehlers–Danlos syndrome (hEDS): hEDS is an inherited connective tissue disorder that is caused by defects in collagen. It is important for clinicians to assess patients with lipedema for hEDS because it can have an impact on treatments offered, taking into account exercise programs, diet recommendations, skin sensitivities, pelvic floor considerations, surgery precautions and pain management approaches.
- Depression and anxiety are very common for a variety of reasons, particularly the fact that diagnosis usually takes a long time and patients have received much advice on diet and exercise in the meantime, neither of which are effective treatments for lipedema, although they may help associated conditions. Joint pain, arthritis, dry skin, fungal infections, cellulitis, and slow wound healing are also comorbid with lipedema.

== Cause ==
The cause of lipedema is still unknown. There are various hypotheses about its pathophysiology, including altered adipogenesis, microangiopathy, and damage to the lymphatic system disturbing its microcirculation. Lipedema has been described in familial clusters, suggesting a genetic component. It often appears around times of hormonal change such as puberty, pregnancy, and menopause, suggesting a potential hormonal component. Having obesity does not cause lipedema, but more than half of people with the condition have a BMI higher than 35.

== Diagnosis ==
Lipedema requires diagnosis in a medical office by a clinician (a “clinical diagnosis”). A trained clinician reaches the diagnosis by considering patient history, including family history, and a physical exam. Clinicians should avoid reliance purely on differential diagnosis as this will lead to a failure to diagnose people with lipedema when they present with other co-morbidities like lymphedema, chronic venous insufficiency.

There is not yet a standardized test, such as bloodwork or imaging, that can confirm the presence of lipedema, however, there are common clinical presentations that are specific to lipedema.

=== Differential diagnosis and comparison of related conditions ===
	Lipedema	Lipo-lymphedema	Lymphedema	Obesity	Venous insufficiency/venous stasis
Symptoms:	Fat deposits/swelling in legs and arms not in hands or feet; hands and feet may be affected as the disease progresses.	Fat deposits / swelling widespread in legs/arms/torso	Swelling in one or more limb, including hands and feet	Fat deposits widespread	Swelling near ankles; brownish discoloration of lower legs (hemosiderin deposits). Minimal swelling is possible.
Male/female:	F	F	F/M	F/M	F/M
Onset:	Around hormonal shifts (puberty, pregnancy, menopause)	Around hormonal shifts	After surgery that affects lymphatic system, or at birth	Any age	Around onset of obesity, diabetes, pregnancy, hypertension
Effects of diet:	Restricting calories ineffective	Restricting calories ineffective	Restricting calories ineffective	Diets and weight loss strategies often effective	No relation to caloric intake
Presence of edema:	Non-pitting edema	Much edema; some pitting; some fibrosis	Pitting edema at first, later non-pitting edema with fibrosis	No edema	Often edema, but can also occur without edema in earlier stages
Presence of Stemmer Sign:	Stemmer's Sign negative	Stemmer's Sign positive	Stemmer's Sign positive	Stemmer's Sign negative	Stemmer's sign may or may not be present in lymphedema/lipolymphedema
Presence of pain:	Pain in affected areas likely	Pain in affected areas	No pain initially	No pain	Pain is likely
Affected population:	Best estimate is 11% adult women (study done in Germany)	Unknown; best estimate is a few percent of adult women	Low	≥30% of US adults	>30% of US adults
Presence of cellulitis:	No history of cellulitis	Likely history of cellulitis	Possible history of cellulitis		Often itching +/- discoloration mistaken for cellulitis
Family history:	Likely	(Of Lipedema) Likely	Not likely (unless primary lymphedema)	Likely	Very likely

=== Lipedema stages ===
Lipedema is classified by stage:

Stage 1
Normal skin surface with enlarged hypodermis (lipedema fat).
Stage 2
Uneven skin with indentations in fat and larger hypodermal masses (lipomas).
Stage 3
Bulky extrusions of skin and fat cause large deformations, especially on the thighs and around the knees. These large extrusions of tissue drastically inhibit mobility.

=== Similar conditions ===
Lipedema is often underdiagnosed due to the difficulty in differentiating it from lymphedema, obesity, or other edemas.

==== Lipo-lymphedema ====
Lipo-lymphedema, a secondary lymphedema, is associated with both lipedema and obesity (which occur together in the majority of cases), most often lipedema stages 2 and 3.

==== Dercum's disease ====
Lipedema / Dercum's disease differentiation – these conditions may co-exist. Dercum's disease is a syndrome of painful growths in subcutaneous fat. Unlike lipedema, which occurs primarily in the trunk and legs, the fatty growths can occur anywhere on the body.

== Treatment ==
Each body is different, and no single formula works for all. People with lipedema are encouraged to slowly incorporate different treatments into their routine to see what best works for them. The primary goals in treating lipedema are to manage inflammation, reduce fibrosis, decrease adipose tissue, improve lymphatic flow, increase mobility, minimize fatigue, manage pain, prioritize emotional and mental health, and promote overall health.

Several treatments may be useful including physiotherapy and light exercise which does not put undue stress on the lymphatic system. The two most common conservative treatments are manual lymphatic drainage, where a therapist gently opens lymphatic channels and moves the lymphatic fluid using hands-on techniques, and compression garments that keep the fluid at bay and assist the sluggish lymphatic flow. Pneumatic compression device or “pump” is useful if there is a lot of swelling or for pain control.

The use of surgical techniques is not universal, but research has shown positive results in both short-term and long-term studies regarding lymph-sparing liposuction and lipectomy.

The studies of the highest quality involve tumescent local anesthesiax, often referred to as simply tumescent liposuction. This can be accomplished via both suction-assisted liposuction and power-assisted (vibrating) liposuction. The treatment of lipedema with tumescent liposuction may require multiple procedures. While many health insurance carriers in the United States do not reimburse for liposuction for lipedema, in 2020 several carriers regarded the procedure as reconstructive and medically necessary and did reimburse. Water-assisted liposuction is technically not considered to be tumescent but achieves the same goal as the anesthetic solution is injected as part of the procedure rather than before-hand. Developed by Doctor Ziah Taufig from Germany, it is usually performed under general anesthesia and is also considered to be lymph-sparing and protective of other tissues such as blood vessels.

== Prognosis ==
There is no known cure for lipedema. People living with lipedema report reduced functionality (mobility and gait), poor quality of life, depression, anxiety, and pain.

== Epidemiology ==
According to an epidemiologic study by Földi E and Földi M, lipedema affects 11% of the female population, although rates from 6-39% have also been reported.

== History ==
Lipedema was first identified in the United States at the Mayo Clinic in 1940. Most attribute the original identification of lipedema to E. A. Hines and L. E. Wold (1951). Despite that, lipedema is barely known in the United States to physicians or to the patients who have the disease. Lipedema often is confused with obesity or lymphedema, and a significant number of patients currently diagnosed as obese are believed to have lipedema, either instead of, or in addition to, obesity.

== See also ==
- Lymphedema
- Steatopygia
- Adiposis dolorosa
- Lipodystrophy
