= Lipoblastomatosis =

Tumor of embryonic fat tissue

Benign lipoblastomatosis
- Other names: Embryonic lipoma
- Specialty: Dermatology

Benign lipoblastomatosis is a tumor consisting of fetal-embryonal adipocytes, frequently confused with a liposarcoma, affecting exclusively infants and young children, with approximately 90% of cases occurring before 3 years of age. The term lipoblastomatosis was first used by Vellios et al. in 1958, at which point the tumor became generally accepted as a distinctive entity. Today Diffuse lipoblastoma is the preferred term for lipoblastomatosis. The tumor is rare, accounting for less than 1% of all childhood neoplasm, and it has been found to be more common in males than females. It often presents as an asymptomatic rapidly enlarging mass, occurring more often in the soft tissues of the extremities.

== Signs and symptoms ==
Although they have also been reported in the head and neck, shoulder, groin, axilla, back, and abdominal cavity, these tumors typically manifest in the extremities. Although it is normally painless, it may cause symptoms such as vomiting, stomach pain, paralysis, or fecal or urinary incontinence, depending on where the mass is anatomically.

== Causes ==
Lipoblastomatosis most likely results from new adipose tissue lobules and lipoblasts proliferating throughout the neonatal period.

== Diagnosis ==
Although imaging modalities like magnetic resonance imaging (MRI) and computed tomography (CT) can be useful, histology confirmation is necessary for an accurate diagnosis.

== Treatment ==
Prompt surgical resection is the advised course of treatment for lipoblastomatosis, particularly if the mass is close to any important organs.

== See also ==
- Myxoid lipoblastoma
- List of cutaneous conditions
