= Lipoblastoma =

Benign tumor originating in fat cells under the skin

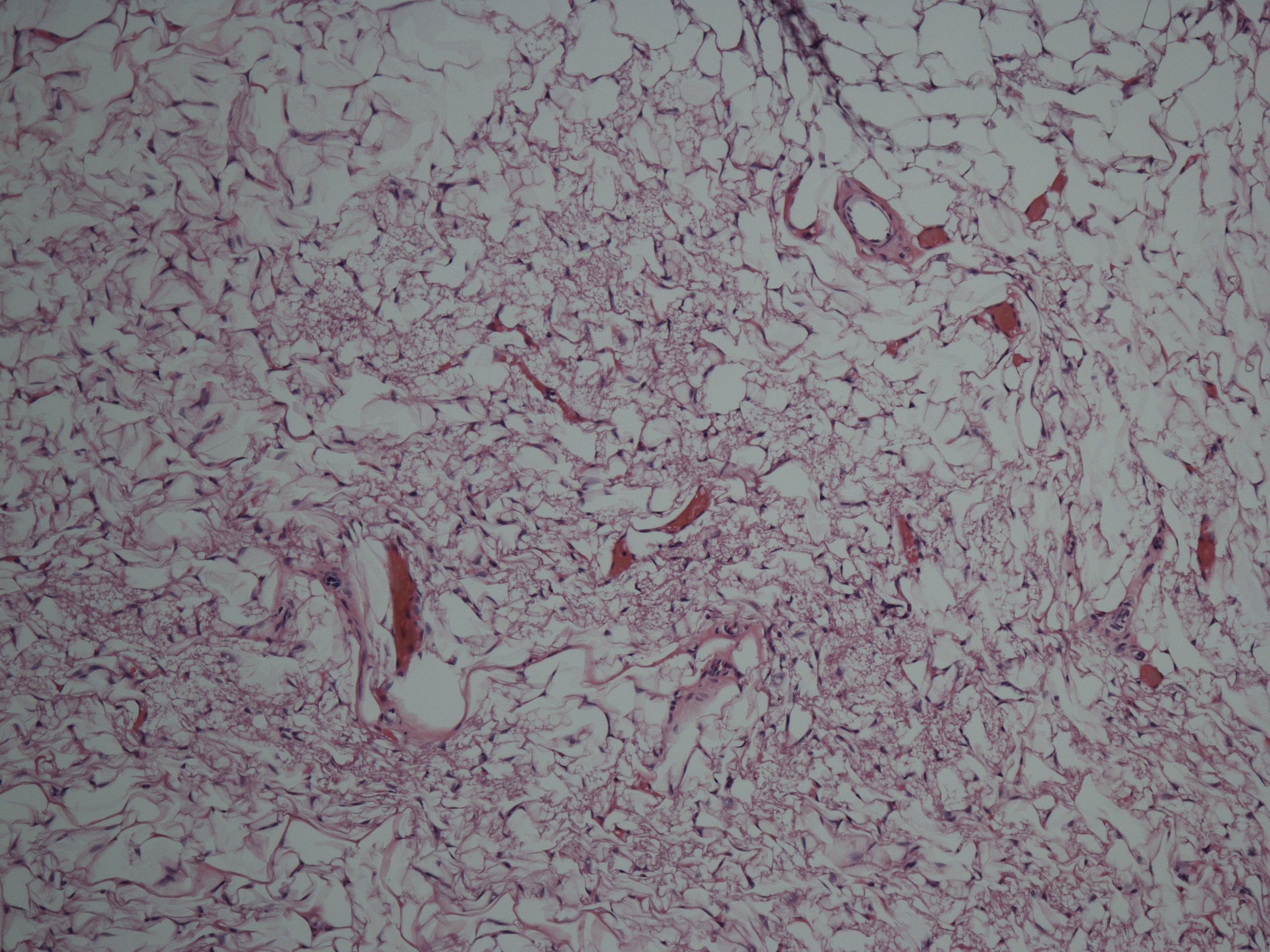
- Lipoblastoma. Note the plexiform vascular pattern and small immature adipocytes.
- Specialty: Oncology

Lipoblastoma is a type of rare, subcutaneous, benign, fatty tumor, found in infants, and children, more common in males with tendency of local recurrence. Local recurrence can happen in up to 80% of incompletely resected tumours. Therefore, complete surgical resection is required to prevent recurrence. It arises from embyronic white fat that is rapidly enlarging. Most common locations are at the trunk and extremities.

Types include:

- Benign lipoblastomatosis, a tumor, also known as an embryonic lipoma, which usually occurs in children under three years old. This is the tumor of brown fat cells.
- Myxoid lipoblastoma, a cutaneous condition characterized by excess mucin

== Specimen ==
=== Macroscopic ===
Grossly, it has a pale yellow, myxoid cut surface with small cystic foci.

=== Microscopic ===
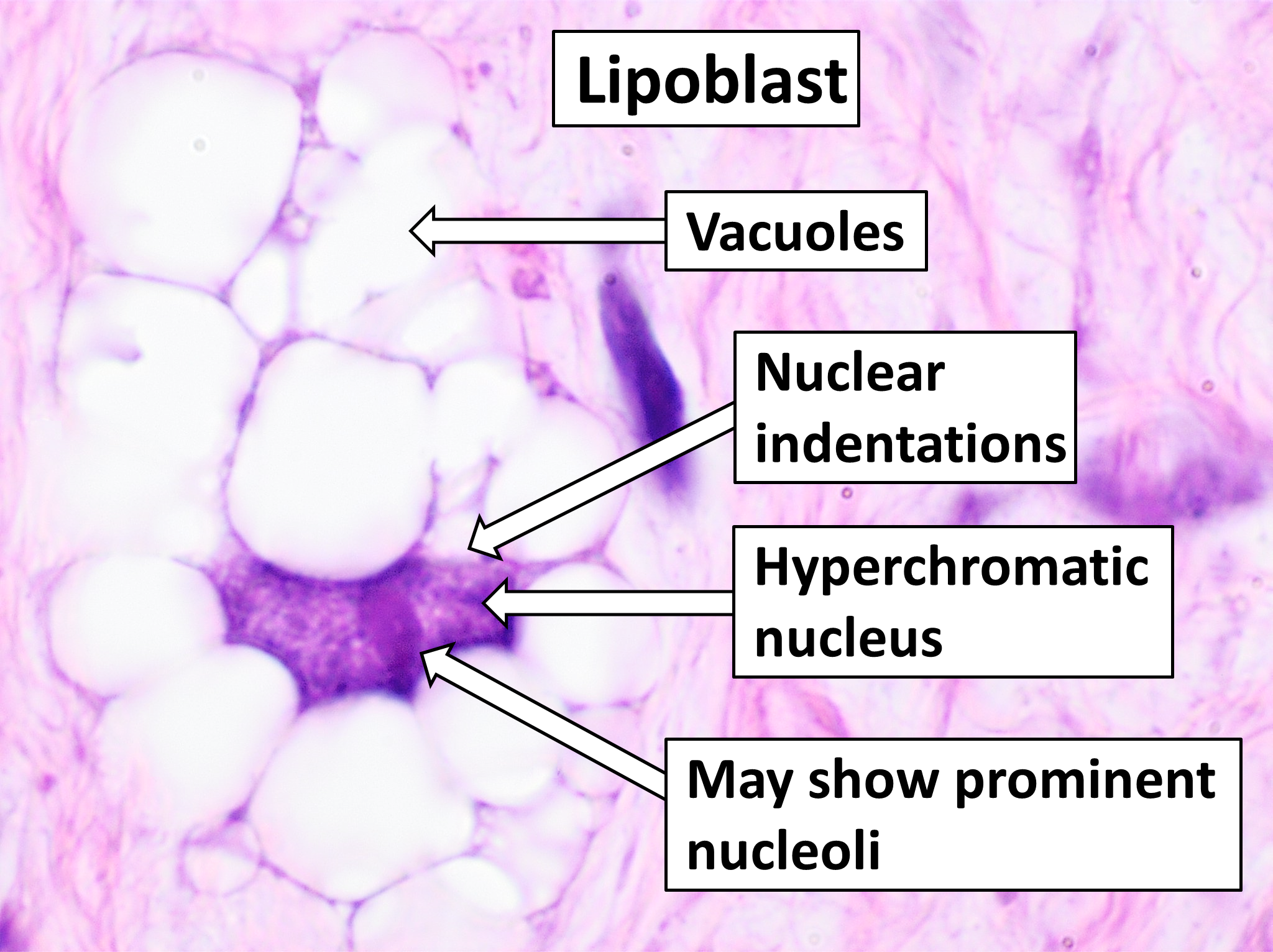
Lipoblast features.

It has lobules consists of immature adipose tissue separated by fibrous septa and lipoblasts at different stages of maturation, without atypia or mitosis. Plexiform capillary network and mature adipose tissue are seen at the central part of the lobule.

== See also ==
- Lipoblast
- Lipoma
