= Eribulin =

Pharmaceutical drug

Clinical data
- Trade names: Halaven, Mevlyq
- Other names: B1939, ER-086526, E7389, NSC-707389, eribulin mesilate (JAN JP), eribulin mesylate (USAN US)
- AHFS/Drugs.com: Monograph
- MedlinePlus: a611007
- License data: US DailyMed: Eribulin
- Pregnancy category: AU: D
- Routes of administration: Intravenous
- Drug class: Antineoplastic
- ATC code: L01XX41 (WHO)

Legal status
- Legal status: AU: S4 (Prescription only); CA: ℞-only; UK: POM (Prescription only); US: ℞-only; EU: Rx-only; Rx-only

Identifiers
- IUPAC name: 2-(3-Amino-2-hydroxypropyl)hexacosahydro-3-methoxy- 26-methyl-20,27-bis(methylene)11,15-18,21-24,28-triepoxy- 7,9-ethano-12,15-methano-9H,15H-furo(3,2-i)furo(2',3'-5,6) pyrano(4,3-b)(1,4)dioxacyclopentacosin-5-(4H)-one
- CAS Number: 253128-41-5
- PubChem CID: 11354606
- DrugBank: DB08871
- ChemSpider: 24721813
- UNII: LR24G6354G
- KEGG: D08914
- ChEBI: CHEBI:63587
- ChEMBL: ChEMBL1683590
- CompTox Dashboard (EPA): DTXSID101009321
- ECHA InfoCard: 100.230.372

Chemical and physical data
- Formula: C_{40}H_{59}NO_{11}
- Molar mass: 729.908 g·mol^{−1}
- 3D model (JSmol): Interactive image
- SMILES: CC1CC2CCC3C(=C)CC(O3)CCC45CC6C(O4)C7C(O6)C(O5)C8C(O7)CCC(O8)CC(=O)CC9C(CC(C1=C)O2)OC(C9OC)CC(CN)O
- InChI: InChI=1S/C40H59NO11/c1-19-11-24-5-7-28-20(2)12-26(45-28)9-10-40-17-33-36(51-40)37-38(50-33)39(52-40)35-29(49-37)8-6-25(47-35)13-22(42)14-27-31(16-30(46-24)21(19)3)48-32(34(27)44-4)15-23(43)18-41/h19,23-39,43H,2-3,5-18,41H2,1,4H3/t19-,23+,24+,25-,26+,27+,28+,29+,30-,31+,32-,33-,34-,35+,36+,37+,38-,39+,40+/m1/s1; Key:UFNVPOGXISZXJD-JBQZKEIOSA-N

Eribulin, sold under the brand name Halaven among others, is an intravenously administered anti-cancer medication used to treat certain patients with breast cancer and liposarcoma. Eribulin was approved for medical use in the United States in November 2010, the European Union in March 2011, Japan in April 2011, and Canada in December 2011. It is available in some jurisdictions as a generic medication.

== Medical uses ==
Eribulin is indicated for the treatment of certain patients with locally advanced or metastatic breast cancer, and for the treatment of adults with unresectable liposarcoma. Details of the specific patient populations covered for use can be found in the various country- or region-specific regulatory approval documention.

== Adverse effects ==
The most serious potential side effects of eribulin include severe neutropenia, peripheral neuropathy, effects on heartbeat (QT prolongation) and harm to developing fetuses. Other common side effects can include anaemia, fatigue, nausea, hair loss (alopecia), constipation, decreased levels of potassium or calcium, abdominal pain, and pyrexia (fever).

== Structure and mechanism ==
Eribulin (previously, B1939, ER-086526, E7389, NSC-707389) is a fully synthetic macrocyclic ketone analog of the marine sponge natural product halichondrin B, a naturally occurring, potent mitotic inhibitor with a unique tubulin-based mechanism of action. Eribulin's parent molecule, halichondrin B, was originally found in the marine sponge Halichondria okadai.

At the molecular level, eribulin is a mechanistically unique inhibitor of microtubule dynamics, binding to a small number of high affinity sites at open plus ends of growing microtubules. Eribulin's near-exclusive preference for microtubule plus end binding (versus microtubule side or minus end binding) results from its ability to distinguish between GTP-β-tubulin present at growing microtubule plus ends versus the GDP-β-tubulin which characterizes mature microtubule sides below the active polymerization sites at microtubule plus ends. The basis for eribulin's ability to discriminate between GTP-β-tubulin and GDP-β-tubulin is direct physical contact between eribulin's so-called "cage structure" at C8-C14 and the ribose moiety of the β-tubulin-embedded guanosine nucleotide.

Therapeutically, eribulin has both cytotoxic and non-cytotoxic mechanisms of action. Its cytotoxic effects are related to its tubulin-based antimitotic activities, wherein apoptosis of cancer cells is induced following prolonged and irreversible mitotic blockade. Eribulin-induced apoptosis is characterized by immunogenic cell death. In addition to its cytotoxic mechanisms, eribulin also exerts complex non-cytotoxic effects on the biology of residual cancer cells, the tumor microenvironment and tumor-host immune responses. Such non-cytotoxic effects appear unrelated to its antimitotic mechanisms, but rather to inhibited interphase microtubule dynamics with consequent effects on plus end binding proteins (+TIPS) and assembly of related signaling scaffolds. Eribulin's non-cytotoxic mechanisms include (i) vascular remodeling that leads to increased tumor perfusion and mitigation of tumor hypoxia, (ii) phenotypic changes in residual cancer cells consistent with reversal of epithelial-mesenchymal transition (EMT), (iii) decreased capacity for migration and invasion leading to reduced metastatic capacity, and (iv) stimulation of and synergy with the cGAS-STING innate immune signaling pathway. Other studies showed that eribulin treatment of leiomyosarcoma and liposarcoma cells leads to increased expression of smooth muscle and adipocyte differentiation antigens, respectively, supporting eribulin's ability to alter cancer cell phenotypes regardless of epithelial versus mesenchymal cell type of origin. Recent studies have shown that eribulin's effects on tumor vasculature involve phenotypic maturation of vascular pericytes, resulting in normalization of the tumor vascular bed. Eribulin's phenotypic effects on both tumor cells and tumor-associated stroma have been linked to chromatin remodeling driven by epigenetic changes in DNA methylation patterns and DNA methyltransferase activities.

Taxane-resistant cancers are often unresponsive to eribulin, although paradoxically eribulin's regulatory approvals in breast cancer were based on increased overall survival (OS) in patients who had previously progressed on taxanes. A 2014 study found that post-taxane eribulin resistance is due to expression of the P-glycoprotein (PgP) multidrug resistance protein 1 (MDR1). Eribulin had previously been shown to be a PgP substrate with the ability to inhibit PgP-mediated drug efflux in cell-based efflux models. Fluorescently labeled eribulin has been used to study the pharmacokinetics and pharmacodynamics at single cell level in vivo.

Eribulin's chemical structure (as ER-086526) was originally published in 2001, and its synthesis was first published in 2004.

== Discovery ==
Eribulin's natural product parent, halichondrin B (HB), was first reported by Hirata and Uemura in 1986, in a paper that demonstrated HB's exquisite anticancer potency against murine cancer cells in vitro and tumor models in vivo. Shortly thereafter, Professor Yoshito Kishi of the Department of Chemistry at Harvard University and his team undertook HB's total synthesis, which they first reported in 1992. Earlier, Kishi had established collaborations with Eisai Research Institute (ERI) in Andover, Massachusetts to evaluate the biological activities of his fully synthetic HB as well as its synthetic intermediates. In July, 1992 ERI scientists confirmed the biological activity of Kishi's synthetic HB at potencies comparable to those reported for the naturally-occurring compound by Hirata and Uemura in 1986. A month later using Kishi's synthetic intermediates, ERI scientists discovered that HB's anticancer activity resides in its so-called Right Half (RH; C1-C38) moiety, which incorporates the macrocyclic lactone and represents about 2/3 of the full HB molecule (see also footnote 3 of Towle et al., 2001). The discovery that HB's anticancer activity resided in RH suggested the possibility that smaller, structurally less complex compounds could be used as starting points for anticancer drug development. Over the next 6 years, more than 200 RH analogs, consisting first of macrocyclic lactones followed by macrocyclic ketones, were synthesized at both ERI and Harvard, with biological evaluations done at ERI. In 1997, macrocyclic ketone ER-086526 (later known as E7389 then eribulin) was synthesized by ERI chemists, a milestone commemorated by the spelling of its eventual International Nonproprietary Name (INN)-approved generic name, ERIbulin. Eribulin's potent in vitro and in vivo anticancer activity, first shown by ERI scientists, was subsequently confirmed by the U.S. National Cancer Institute (NCI) working under a Cooperative Research and Development Agreement (CRADA) created with ERI to support preclinical IND-enabling studies. In 2002, NCI sponsored the first-in-human Phase I clinical trial of eribulin using compound supplied by ERI. This trial, conducted by the California Cancer Consortium and led by City of Hope Comprehensive Cancer Center in Duarte, California, established the still-current dosing schedule of 1.4 mg/m^{2} on days 1 and 8 of a 21-day cycle. Development-path Phase II and Phase III clinical trials were subsequently sponsored by Eisai.

== Research ==
Eribulin is being investigated for use in a variety of cancer types as monotherapy or in combination with other agents. As of April, 2026, currently recruiting studies include various breast cancer subtypes, ovarian and uterine carcinosarcomas, melanoma, liposarcoma, leiomyosarcoma, various other sarcomas and pediatric solid tumors, and various other advanced solid tumor types.

Two eribulin based products are in the research and development phase; a liposomal formulation and antibody drug combination therapy, both are for the treatment of solid tumors. The liposomal formulation of eribulin, E7389 liposomal, is in Phase I clinical trials. Preliminary in vivo experiments show a decrease in C(max) and a longer half-life with the liposomal formulation. The drug antibody eribulin combination therapy is a joint venture between Eisai and Merck. The clinical trials combine eribulin and pembrolizumab, a PD-1 inhibitor, for the treatment of breast cancer and other advanced cancers.
