= Brigimadlin =

Names
- IUPAC name (3S,10'S,11'S,14'S)-6-chloro-11'-(3-chloro-2-fluorophenyl)-13'-(cyclopropylmethyl)-6'-methyl-2-oxospiro[1H-indole-3,12'-8,9,13-triazatetracyclo[7.6.0.0^{2,7}.0^{10,14}]pentadeca-1,3,5,7-tetraene]-5'-carboxylic acid

Identifiers
CAS Number	2095116-40-6
3D model (JSmol)	Interactive image
ChemSpider	128922236
DrugBank	DB18578
EC Number	826-645-5
KEGG	D12842
PubChem CID	129264140
UNII	9A934ZAN94
- InChI: InChI=1S/C31H25Cl2FN4O3/c1-14-17(29(39)40)8-9-18-23-12-24-28(38(23)36-27(14)18)25(19-3-2-4-21(33)26(19)34)31(37(24)13-15-5-6-15)20-10-7-16(32)11-22(20)35-30(31)41/h2-4,7-11,15,24-25,28H,5-6,12-13H2,1H3,(H,35,41)(H,39,40)/t24-,25-,28+,31+/m0/s1 Key: AMTXDBGKYPDTTA-SJVQGLCSSA-N
- SMILES: CC1=C(C=CC2=C3C[C@H]4[C@@H](N3N=C12)[C@@H]([C@]5(N4CC6CC6)C7=C(C=C(C=C7)Cl)NC5=O)C8=C(C(=CC=C8)Cl)F)C(=O)O

Properties
Chemical formula	C_{31}H_{25}Cl_{2}FN_{4}O_{3}
Molar mass	591.46 g·mol^{−1}

Hazards
- GHS labelling
Pictograms	(GHS07: Exclamation mark) (GHS08: Health hazard)
Signal word	Danger
Hazard statements	H300, H360Df, H372, H413
Precautionary statements	P203, P260, P264, P270, P273, P280, P301+P316, P318, P319, P321, P330, P405, P501
- Except where otherwise noted, data are given for materials in their standard state (at 25 °C [77 °F], 100 kPa). Infobox references

Brigimadlin (BI-907828) is a small molecule MDM2-TP53 inhibitor developed for liposarcoma.
