= Milademetan =

Chemical compound

Clinical data
- Other names: DS-3032

Identifiers
- CAS Number: 1398568-47-2
- PubChem CID: 73297272
- IUPHAR/BPS: 12941
- DrugBank: DB15257
- UNII: R3I80TLN7S
- KEGG: D12621
- ChEMBL: ChEMBL4292264

Chemical and physical data
- Formula: C_{30}H_{34}Cl_{2}FN_{5}O_{4}
- Molar mass: 618.53 g·mol^{−1}
- 3D model (JSmol): Interactive image
- SMILES: CC1(CCC2(CC1)[C@@]3([C@H]([C@@H](N2)C(=O)N[C@@H]4CC[C@H](OC4)C(=O)N)C5=C(C(=NC=C5)Cl)F)C6=C(C=C(C=C6)Cl)NC3=O)C
- InChI: InChI=1S/C30H34Cl2FN5O4/c1-28(2)8-10-29(11-9-28)30(18-5-3-15(31)13-19(18)37-27(30)41)21(17-7-12-35-24(32)22(17)33)23(38-29)26(40)36-16-4-6-20(25(34)39)42-14-16/h3,5,7,12-13,16,20-21,23,38H,4,6,8-11,14H2,1-2H3,(H2,34,39)(H,36,40)(H,37,41)/t16-,20+,21+,23-,30-/m1/s1; Key:RYAYYVTWKAOAJF-QISPRATLSA-N

Milademetan is an investigational new drug that is being evaluated to treat liposarcoma. It is a MDM2 inhibitor.
