= The Wendy Walk =

American nonprofit organization

The Wendy Walk is a not-for-profit organization whose mission is to raise funds and awareness for liposarcoma, a rare form of soft tissue cancer that is currently untreatable.

The foundation hosts annual walks in Miami, New York City, and Los Angeles as its main fundraising event. Through these walks, the foundation has raised over 2 million dollars for liposarcoma research. Liposarcoma is an "orphan" cancer, therefore it depends solely on new research. Progress has been made in finding the root cause of liposarcoma, largely as a result of funding provided by The Wendy Walk and its partner organization the Liddy Shriver Sarcoma Initiative.

The Wendy Walk was started in 2010, by Ali, Matt and Jackie Landes in response to their mother's diagnosis with the disease. Wendy Landes died in March 2013. The Wendy Walk continues to expand nationally in participants and fundraising. Throughout the 2012 walk season alone, 1,600 participants supported by thousands of donors raised over three quarters of a million dollars in the fight against liposarcoma through the Liddy Shriver Sarcoma Initiative.
