= RCBTB2 =

Protein-coding gene in the species Homo sapiens

Identifiers
- Aliases: RCBTB2, CHC1L, RLG, RCC1 and BTB domain containing protein 2
- External IDs: OMIM: 603524; MGI: 1917200; GeneCards: RCBTB2

Gene location (Human)
Chr.	Chromosome 13 (human)
Band	13q14.2	Start	48,488,963 bp
Band	13q14.2	End	48,533,256 bp

Gene location (Mouse)
Chr.	Chromosome 14 (mouse)
Band	14|14 D3	Start	73,360,477 bp
Band	14|14 D3	End	73,445,283 bp
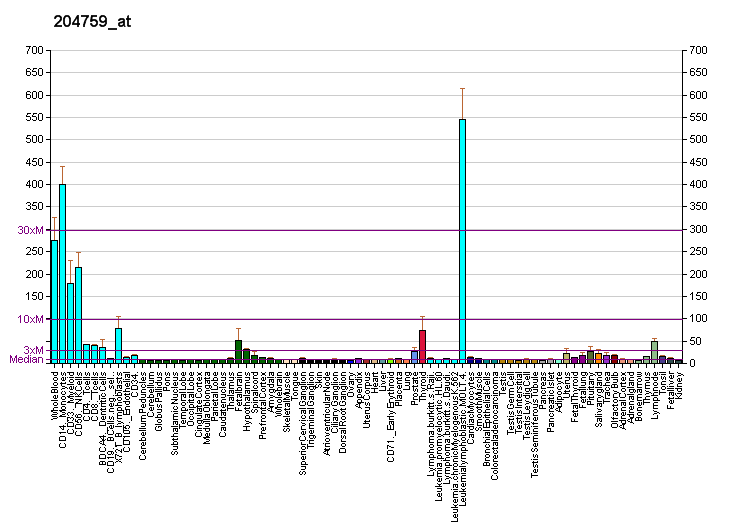
RNA expression pattern
Bgee	Human / Mouse (ortholog); Top expressed in: secondary oocyte; monocyte; optic nerve; parietal pleura; visceral pleura; Epithelium of choroid plexus; retinal pigment epithelium; seminal vesicula; ganglionic eminence; ventricular zone / Top expressed in: otic vesicle; saccule; otic placode; mandibular prominence; thymus; maxillary prominence; somite; ventricular zone; brown adipose tissue; genital tubercle; More reference expression data
BioGPS	More reference expression data
Gene ontology
Molecular function	protein binding
Cellular component	acrosomal vesicle; cytoplasmic vesicle
Biological process	regulation of molecular function
Sources:Amigo / QuickGO
Orthologs
Databases	NCBI: entry; OMA: entry
Species	Human	Mouse
Entrez	1102	105670
Ensembl	ENSG00000136161	ENSMUSG00000022106
UniProt	O95199	Q99LJ7
RefSeq (mRNA)	NM_001268; NM_001286830; NM_001286831; NM_001286832; NM_001352424 NM_001352425; NM_001352426; NM_001352427; NM_001352428; NM_001352429; NM_001352430; NM_001352431	NM_001170694; NM_134083
RefSeq (protein)	NP_001259; NP_001273759; NP_001273760; NP_001273761; NP_001339353 NP_001339354; NP_001339355; NP_001339356; NP_001339357; NP_001339358; NP_001339359; NP_001339360	NP_001164165; NP_598844
Location (UCSC)	Chr 13: 48.49 – 48.53 Mb	Chr 14: 73.36 – 73.45 Mb
PubMed search
- Wikidata
View/Edit Human	View/Edit Mouse

RCC1 and BTB domain-containing protein 2 is a protein that in humans is encoded by the RCBTB2 gene.

This gene encodes a member of the RCC1-related GEF family. The N-terminal half of the encoded amino acid sequence shows similarity to the regulator of chromosome condensation RCC1, which acts as a guanine nucleotide exchange factor (GEF) protein for the Ras-related GTPase Ran.
