= Myxoid lipoblastoma =

- Specialty: Dermatology

Myxoid lipoblastoma is a cutaneous condition characterized by excess mucin. It resembles myxoid liposarcoma.

== See also ==
- Benign lipoblastomatosis
- List of cutaneous conditions
