= TSPAN31 =

Protein-coding gene in humans

Identifiers
- Aliases: TSPAN31, SAS, tetraspanin 31
- External IDs: OMIM: 181035; MGI: 1914375; GeneCards: TSPAN31

Gene location (Human)
Chr.	Chromosome 12 (human)
Band	12q14.1	Start	57,738,013 bp
Band	12q14.1	End	57,750,219 bp

Gene location (Mouse)
Chr.	Chromosome 10 (mouse)
Band	10|10 D3	Start	126,903,149 bp
Band	10|10 D3	End	126,906,133 bp
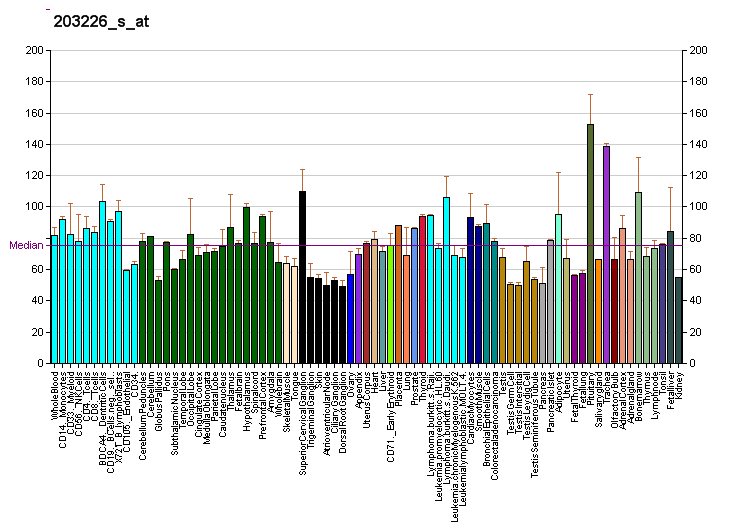

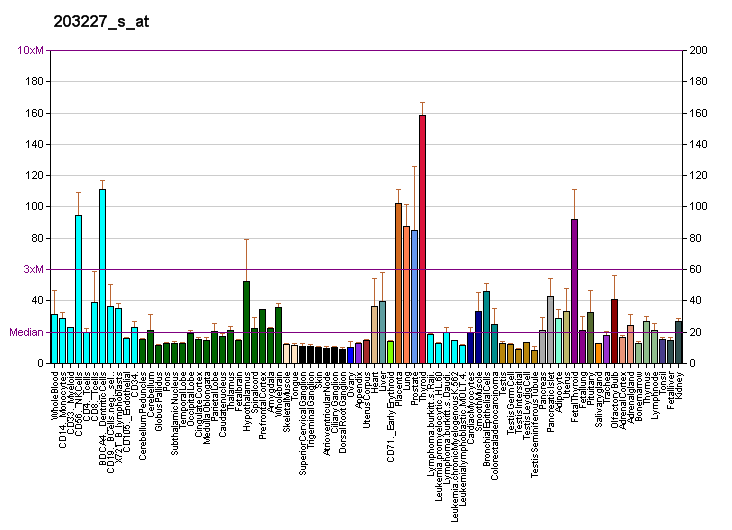
RNA expression pattern
Bgee	Human / Mouse (ortholog); Top expressed in: pancreatic ductal cell; islet of Langerhans; pericardium; right lobe of thyroid gland; right adrenal gland; corpus epididymis; endothelial cell; right adrenal cortex; renal medulla; gallbladder / Top expressed in: left lobe of liver; medullary collecting duct; renal corpuscle; calvaria; cumulus cell; medial ganglionic eminence; molar; vas deferens; efferent ductule; aortic valve; More reference expression data
BioGPS	More reference expression data
Orthologs
Databases	NCBI: entry; OMA: entry
Species	Human	Mouse
Entrez	6302	67125
Ensembl	ENSG00000135452	ENSMUSG00000006736
UniProt	Q12999	Q9CQ88
RefSeq (mRNA)	NM_005981; NM_001330168; NM_001330169	NM_025982
RefSeq (protein)	NP_001317097; NP_001317098; NP_005972	NP_080258
Location (UCSC)	Chr 12: 57.74 – 57.75 Mb	Chr 10: 126.9 – 126.91 Mb
PubMed search
- Wikidata
View/Edit Human	View/Edit Mouse

Tetraspanin-31 is a protein that in humans is encoded by the TSPAN31 gene.

The protein encoded by this gene is a member of the transmembrane 4 superfamily, also known as the tetraspanin family. Most of these members are cell-surface proteins that are characterized by the presence of four hydrophobic domains. The proteins mediate signal transduction events that play a role in the regulation of cell development, activation, growth and motility. This encoded protein is thought to be involved in growth-related cellular processes. This gene is associated with tumorigenesis and osteosarcoma.
