= Lipoblast =

Precursor cell for an adipocyte (fat cell)

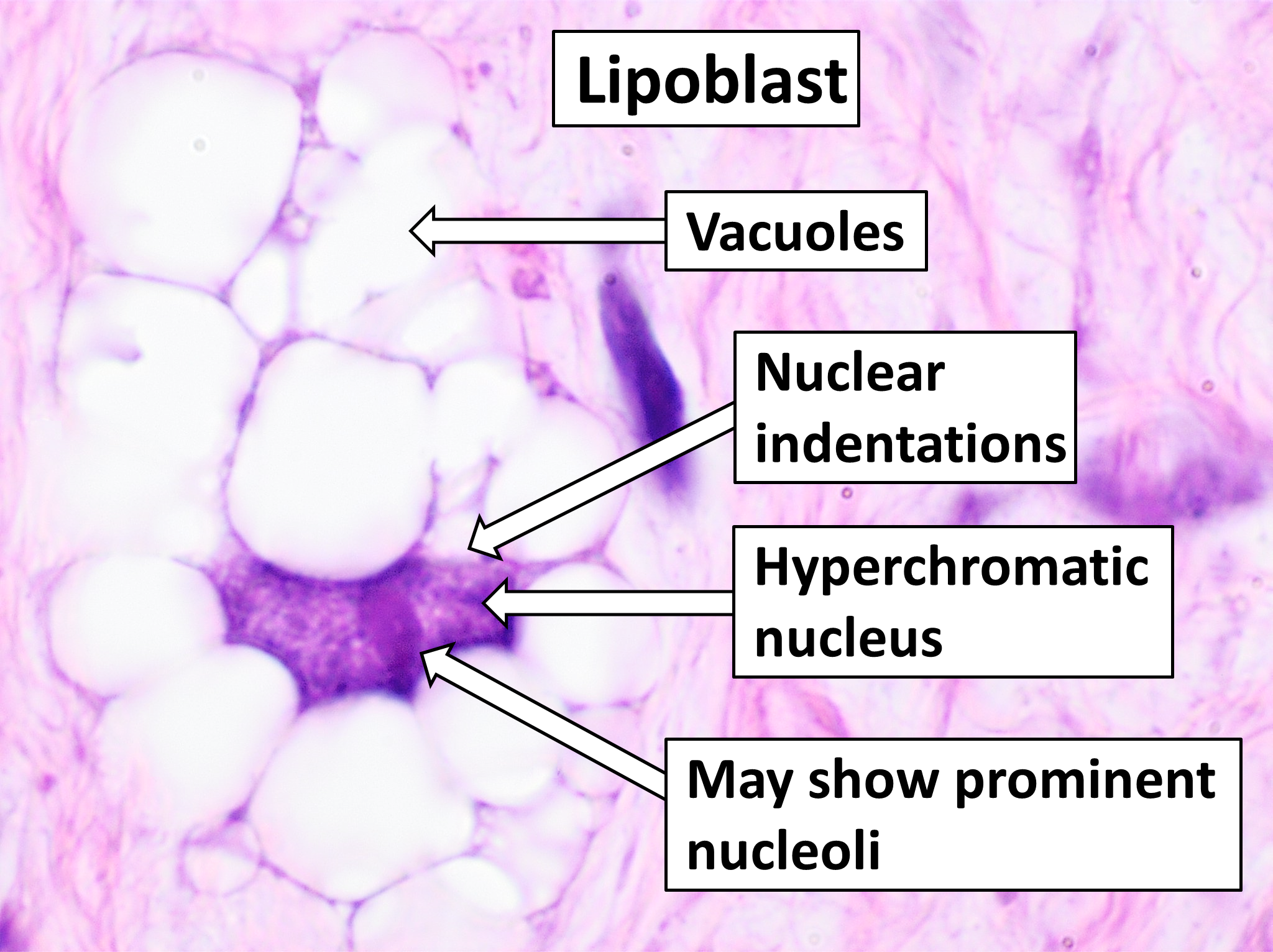
Lipoblast features.

A lipoblast is a precursor cell for an adipocyte. Alternate terms include adipoblast and preadipocyte. Early stages are almost indistinguishable from fibroblasts.

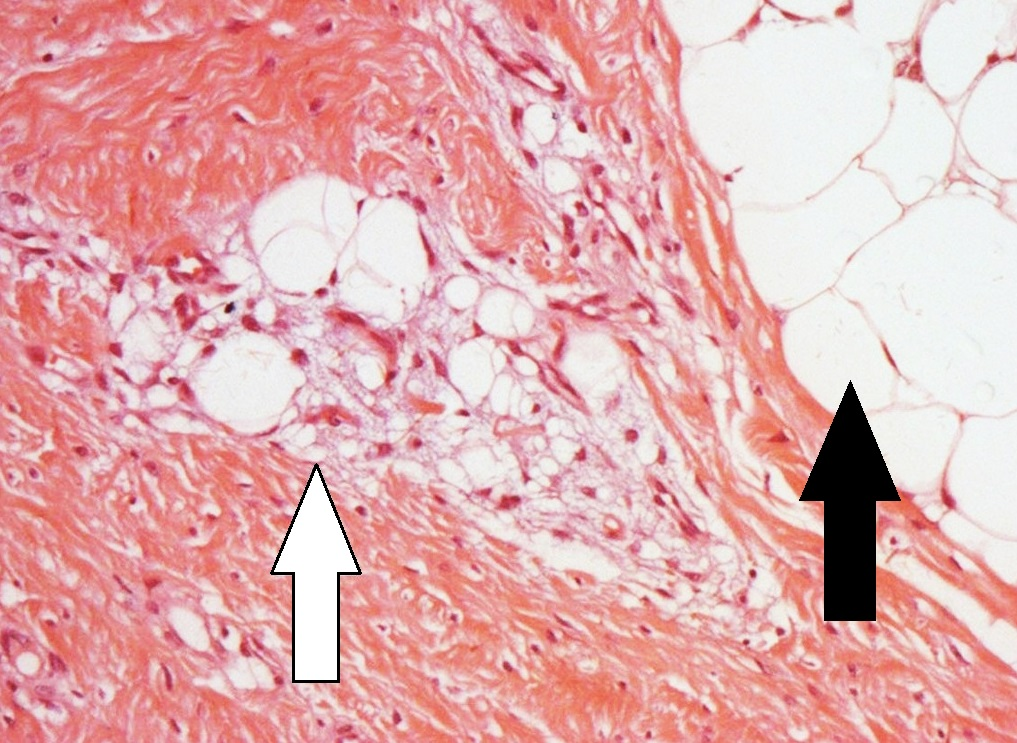
Lipoblasts (white arrow) and lipocytes (black arrow), in a case of lipoblastoma

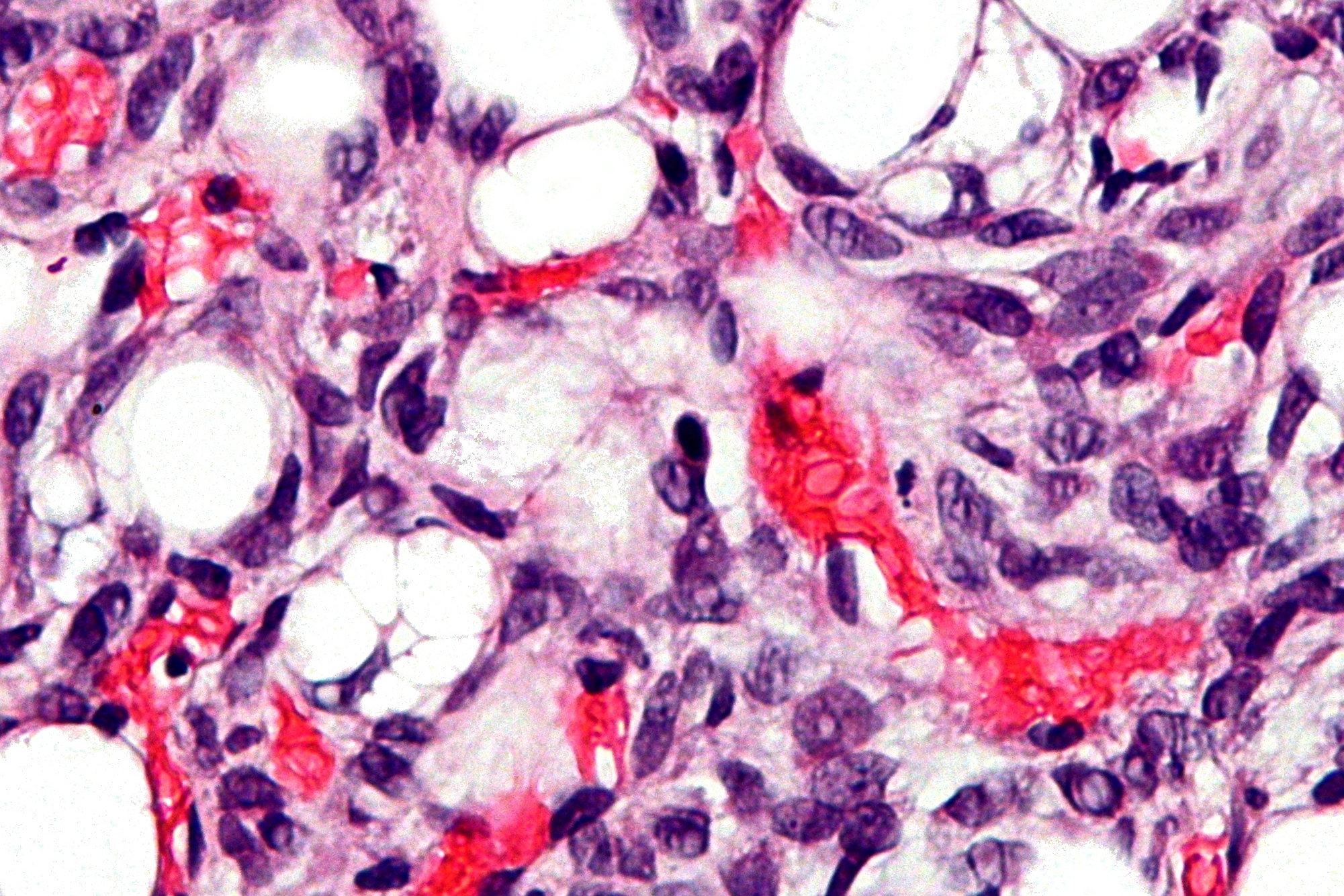
Micrograph showing a lipoblast (left-bottom of image) in a liposarcoma. H&E stain.

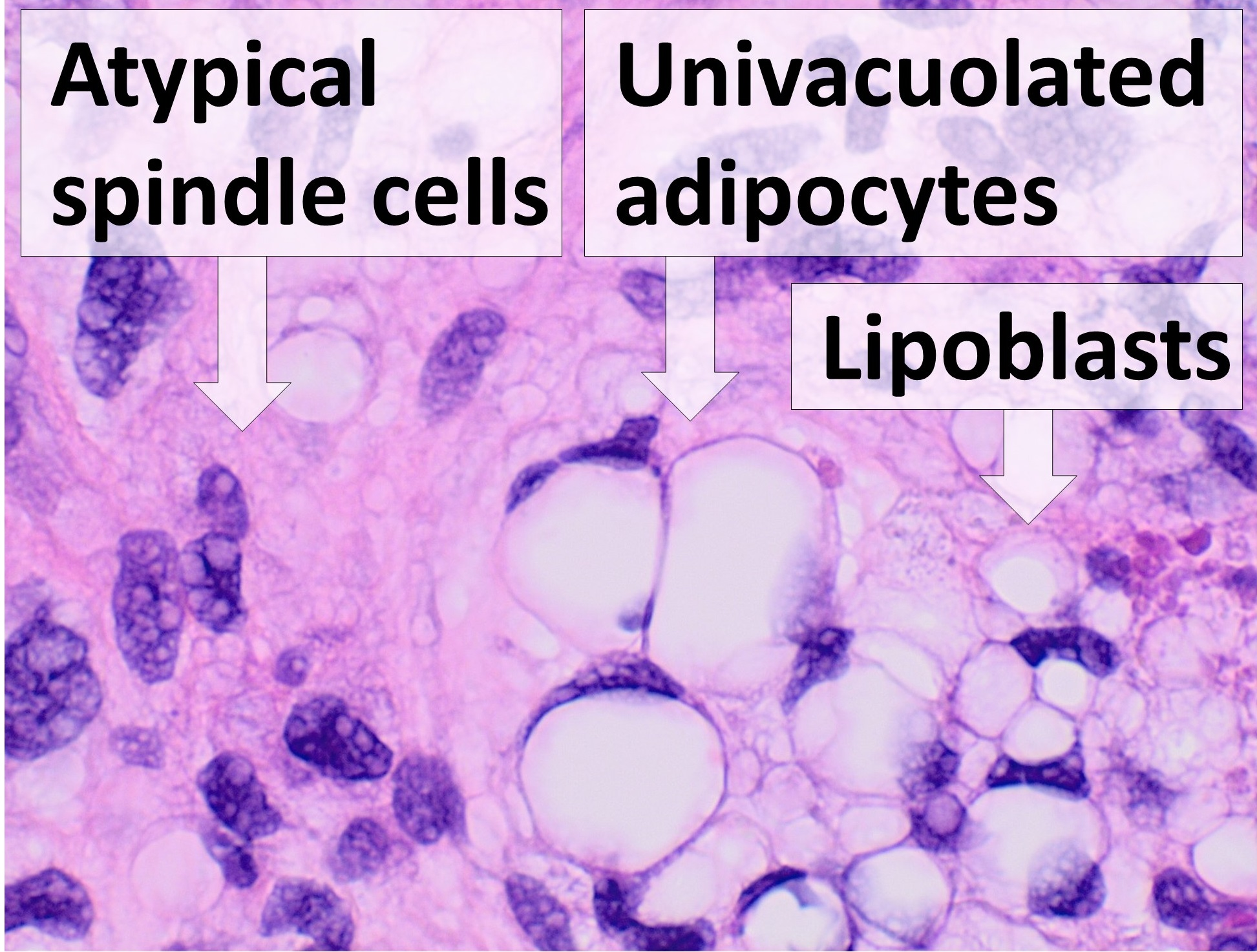
Histopathology of liposarcoma, H&E stain, with the main features:
- Spindle cells with enlarged, hyperchromatic nuclei.
- Apparently univacuolated adipocytes (may look normal).
- Lipoblasts (multivacuolated), but neither necessary nor sufficient for diagnosis of liposarcoma.

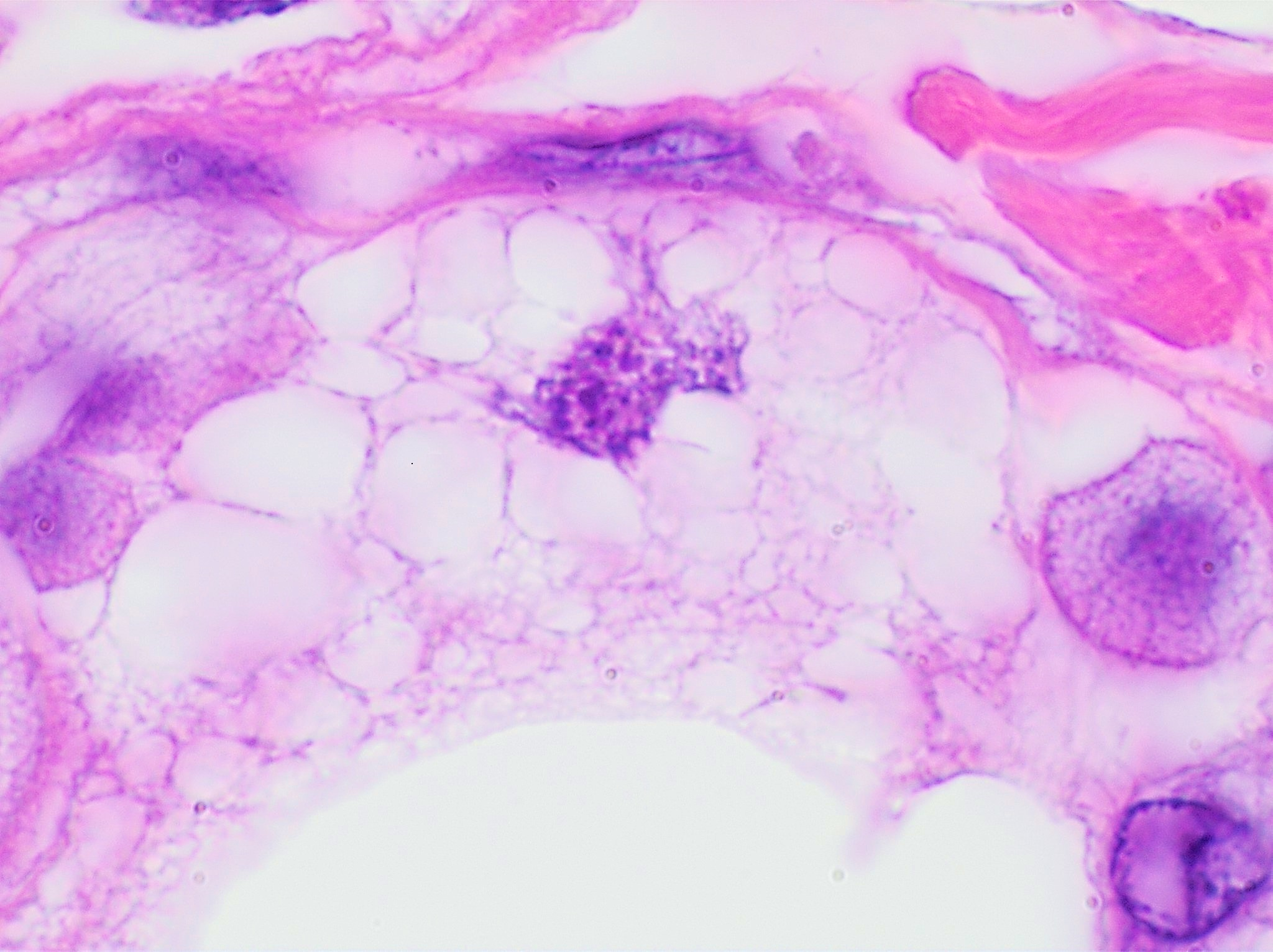
Lipid-laden histiocytes may mimic lipoblasts, but have lightly eosinophilic cytoplasm and a small normochromatic nuclei which are not hollowed out from the lipid vacuoles.

== Liposarcoma ==
Lipoblasts are seen in liposarcoma and characteristically have abundant multivacuolated clear cytoplasm and a dark staining (hyperchromatic), indented nucleus.

== See also ==
- Adipogenesis
- Adipose differentiation-related protein
- Lipoblastoma
- List of human cell types derived from the germ layers
