= RP1 =

Protein-coding gene in humans

Identifiers
- Aliases: RP1, DCDC4A, Oretinitis pigmentosa 1 (autosomal dominant), axonemal microtubule associated, RP1 axonemal microtubule associated
- External IDs: OMIM: 603937; MGI: 1341105; GeneCards: RP1

Gene location (Human)
Chr.	Chromosome 8 (human)
Band	8q11.23-q12.1	Start	54,509,422 bp
Band	8q11.23-q12.1	End	54,871,720 bp

Gene location (Mouse)
Chr.	Chromosome 1 (mouse)
Band	1 A1|1 1.65 cM	Start	4,069,780 bp
Band	1 A1|1 1.65 cM	End	4,479,464 bp
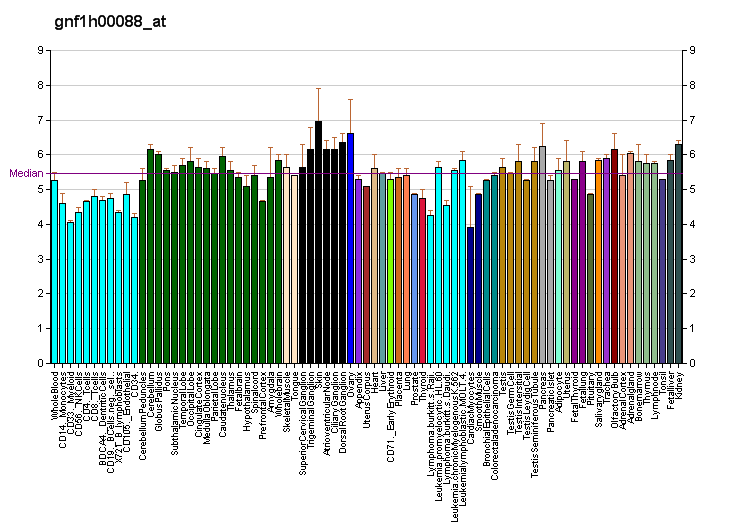
RNA expression pattern
Bgee	Human / Mouse (ortholog); Top expressed in: right uterine tube; olfactory zone of nasal mucosa; testicle; gonad; right lung; bronchial epithelial cell; upper lobe of left lung; human kidney; retina; retinal pigment epithelium / Top expressed in: neural layer of retina; retinal pigment epithelium; epithelium of lens; ciliary body; spermatocyte; spermatid; iris; morula; conjunctival fornix; cornea; More reference expression data
BioGPS	More reference expression data
Gene ontology
Molecular function	microtubule binding; protein binding
Cellular component	cytoplasm; cell projection; photoreceptor outer segment; cilium; microtubule; cytoskeleton; photoreceptor inner segment; microtubule associated complex; axoneme; photoreceptor connecting cilium; ciliary tip
Biological process	intracellular signal transduction; response to stimulus; photoreceptor cell development; cell projection organization; phototransduction of visible light; visual perception; axoneme assembly; photoreceptor cell outer segment organization; photoreceptor cell maintenance; retinal rod cell development; retinal cone cell development; retina development in camera-type eye; retina morphogenesis in camera-type eye; cellular response to light stimulus; positive regulation of non-motile cilium assembly
Sources:Amigo / QuickGO
Orthologs
Databases	NCBI: entry; OMA: entry
Species	Human	Mouse
Entrez	6101	19888
Ensembl	ENSG00000104237	ENSMUSG00000025900
UniProt	P56715	P56716
RefSeq (mRNA)	NM_006269	NM_001195662; NM_011283; NM_001370921
RefSeq (protein)	NP_006260; NP_001362583	NP_001182591; NP_035413; NP_001357850
Location (UCSC)	Chr 8: 54.51 – 54.87 Mb	Chr 1: 4.07 – 4.48 Mb
PubMed search
- Wikidata
View/Edit Human	View/Edit Mouse

Oxygen-regulated protein 1 also known as retinitis pigmentosa 1 protein (RP1) is a protein that in humans is encoded by the RP1 gene.

== Function ==
This gene encodes a member of the doublecortin family. The protein encoded by this gene contains two doublecortin domains that bind to microtubules and regulate microtubule polymerization. The encoded protein is a protein associated with the photoreceptor cell microtubules in the retina and is necessary for the correct stacking of outer segment discs. This protein and another retinal-specific protein, RP1L1, play essential and synergistic roles in affecting photosensitivity and outer segment morphogenesis of rod photoreceptor cells.

== History ==
Initially named "ORP1" for its response to in vivo retinal oxygen levels (designated ORP1 for 'oxygen-regulated protein-1'), this gene was subsequently linked to autosomal dominant retinitis pigmentosa and was renamed RP1 for 'retinitis pigmentosa 1'.

== Clinical significance ==
Mutations in this gene cause autosomal dominant or autosomal recessive retinitis pigmentosa. Transcript variants produced by alternative promoters and alternative splicing have been discovered that overlap with the current reference sequence and have multiple exons upstream and downstream of the current reference sequence. However, as of 2010, it is currently impossible to determine the biological effectiveness and full-length nature of certain variants.

== See also ==
- Disc shedding
