= Fetal rhabdomyoma =

Benign tumor of skeletal muscle

Rhabdomyoma is a benign mesenchymal tumor of skeletal muscle, separated into two major categories based on site: Cardiac and extracardiac. They are further separated by histology: fetal (myxoid and cellular), juvenile (intermediate), and adult types. Genital types are recognized, but are often part of either the fetal or juvenile types. The fetal type is thought to recapitulate immature skeletal muscle at about week six to ten of gestational development.

== Signs and symptoms ==
Most fetal rhabdomyomas are tumors that develop in the head and neck or in the genital region. There are a number of cases which have been seen in association with Gorlin syndrome. However, cardiac rhabdomyomas are known to be associated with tuberous sclerosis.

== Pathophysiology ==
=== Gross pathology ===
The tumor may be seen within the subcutaneous tissues (below the skin), mucosal surfaces or in soft tissue. Within the head and neck, the posterior ear region, skin of the face, and the tongue are the most commonly affected sites (about a 2:1 ratio of soft tissue to mucosa). The tumors are well defined, non-specific usually solitary masses, but when seen in the head and neck (or genital region), they may be polypoid. Tumors range in dimension from a few millimeters up to 12.5 cm, with a mean of about 3.0 cm. Although there are isolated case reports, multifocality is very rare.

=== Microscopic pathology ===
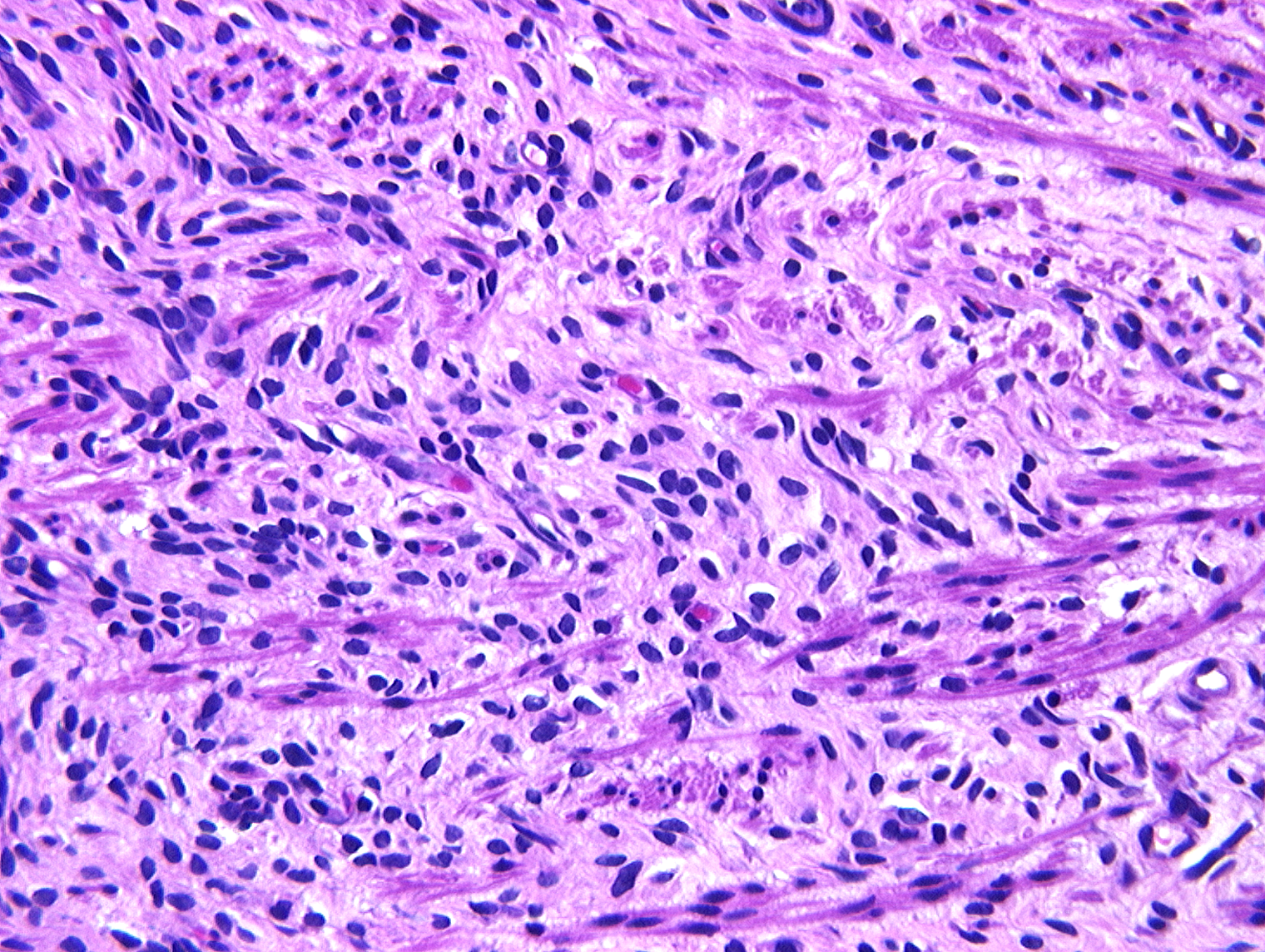
A hematoxylin and eosin stained image (high power) of the short spindle cells of a fetal rhabdomyoma.

Fetal rhabdomyoma are separated into two histologic types: Myxoid and cellular. However, irrespective of histologic type, these tumors almost never show necrosis or increased mitoses. However, a cambium layer, abnormal mitoses and nuclear pleomorphism is not seen.

Cellular fetal rhabdomyomas are composed of bland, primitive spindled cells. The spindle cells are haphazardly arranged primitive, elongated skeletal muscle cells. The cells are set within a well-developed fibromyxoid stroma. A different pattern (intermediate type) is predominantly composed of cells with better differentiation towards skeletal muscle. There are often large ganglion cell-like rhabdomyoblasts showing prominent nucleoli within nuclei that show vesicular chromatin distribution. Another population includes strap-like rhabdomyoblasts with darkly staining pink cytoplasm. Nearly all tumors show short to more sweeping fascicles of spindled rhabdomyoblasts. The tumor cells may infiltrate into adjacent skeletal muscle or fat. It is not uncommon to see peri-neural association, although not perineural infiltration.

== Diagnosis ==
These tumors may be detected prenatally by ultrasound and MRI. Additionally, preoperative fine needle aspiration can be used to diagnose the tumor.

=== Ancillary testing ===
A phosphotungstic acid hematoxylin stain may be used to highlight cross striations in the cytoplasm of the tumor cells. PAS with diastase will highlight the presence of glycogen in the tumor cells' cytoplasm. Immunohistochemistry will yield a positive reaction with a variety of myoid markers, including desmin, myoglobin, myogenin, MYOD1 and muscle specific actin. They may also be positive with vimentin, smooth muscle actin, and Leu-7. However, the tumor cells are almost always negative with glial fibrillary acidic protein, S100 protein, cytokeratin, epithelial membrane antigen, CD68, FLI1, CD99 and CD56. Although not used as frequently now, electron microscopy will show thick and thin myofilaments, Z-bands: these are features of sarcometric differentiation.

=== Differential diagnosis ===
The differential diagnosis histologically includes rhabdomyosarcoma, granular cell tumor, alveolar soft part sarcoma, hibernoma, oncocytoma, and crystal storing histiocytosis, among others.

== Management ==
Surgical excision is the treatment of choice. Recurrences are reported, but this is usually due to incomplete removal initially. There is no role for chemotherapy or radiation therapy.

== Epidemiology ==
They present over a wide age range (birth to about 65 years), but within the head and neck region, about 50% of cases develop in patients younger than 15 years of age. Within the head and neck, males are affected about 2–3 times more often than females.
