= Lipomatosis =

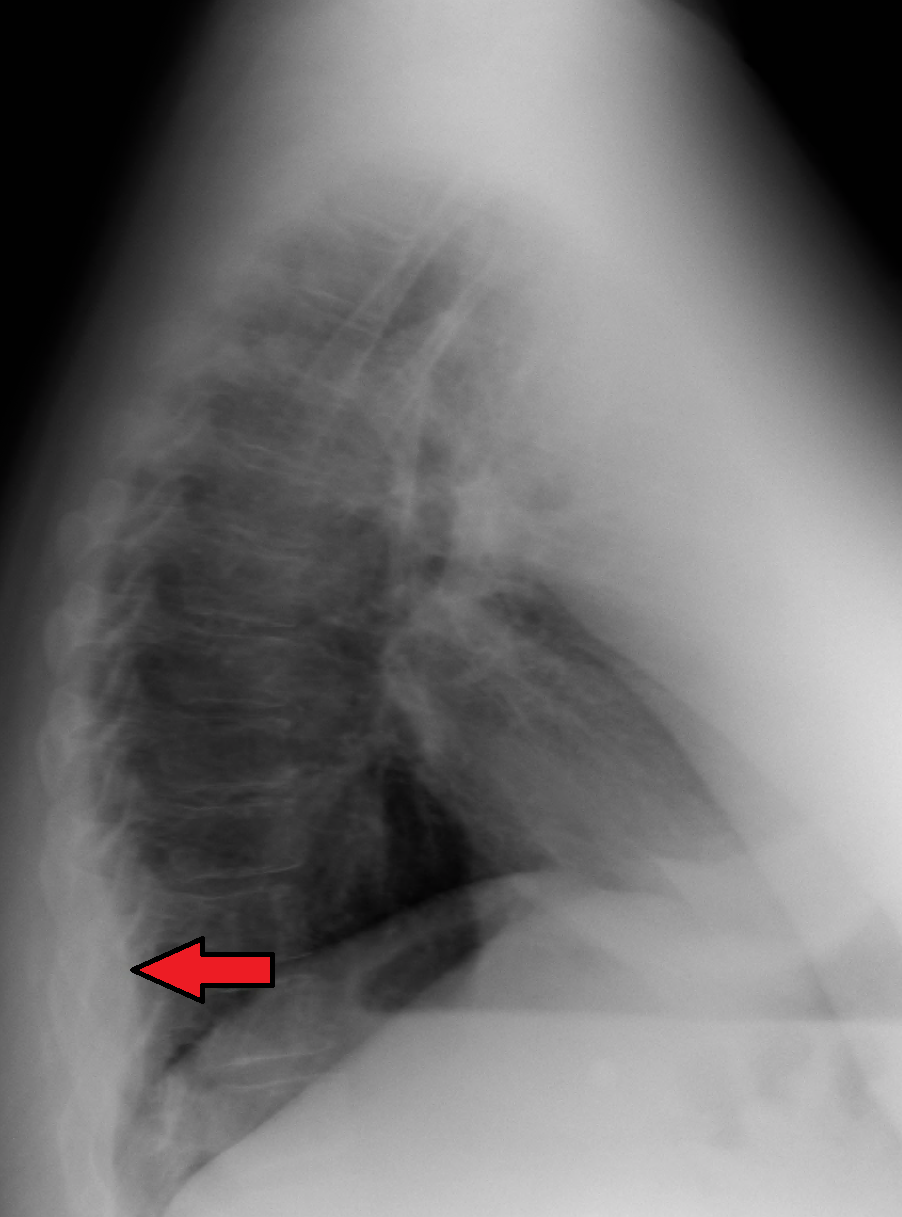
- Mediastinal lipomatosis
- Specialty: Endocrinology

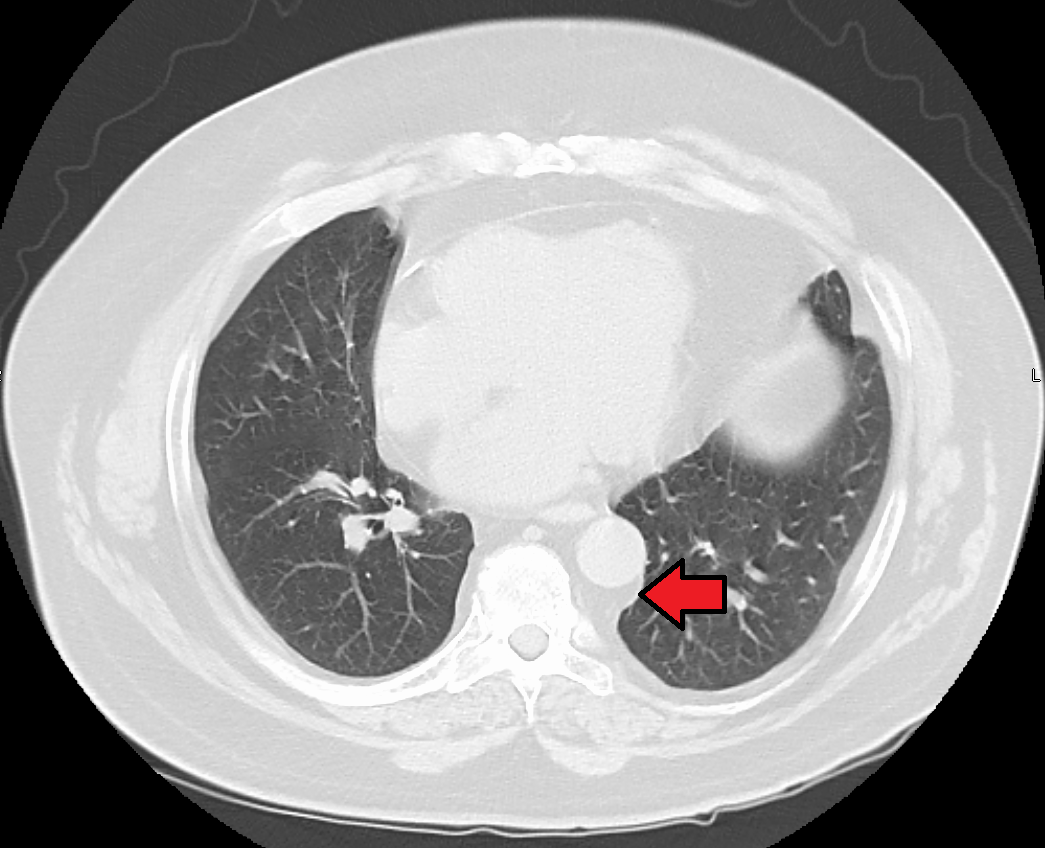
Mediastinal lipomatosis

Lipomatosis is believed to be an autosomal dominant condition in which multiple lipomas are present on the body. Many discrete, encapsulated lipomas form on the trunk and extremities, with relatively few on the head and shoulders. In 1993, a genetic polymorphism within lipomas was localized to chromosome 12q15, where the HMGIC gene encodes the high-mobility-group protein isoform I-C. This is one of the most commonly found mutations in solitary lipomatous tumors but lipomas often have multiple mutations. Reciprocal translocations involving chromosomes 12q13 and 12q14 have also been observed within.

Although this condition is benign, it can sometimes be very painful depending on location of the lipomas. Some patients who are concerned with cosmetics seek removal of individual lipomas. Removal can include simple excision, endoscopic removal, or liposuction.

Other entities which are accompanied by multiple lipomas include Proteus syndrome, Cowden syndrome and related disorders due to PTEN gene mutations, benign symmetric lipomatosis (Madelung disease), Dercum's Disease, familial lipodystrophy, hibernomas, epidural steroid injections with epidural lipomatosis, and familial angiolipomatosis.

== Etymology ==
"Fatty tumor" (plural lipomata), 1830, medical Latin, from Greek lipos "fat" (n.), from PIE root *leip- "to stick, adhere," also used to form words for "fat," + -oma, word-forming element expressing state or condition, in medical terminology denoting "a state of disease," from Latin -osis and directly from Greek -osis, formed from the aorist of verbs ending in -o. It corresponds to Latin -atio.

== See also ==
- Pelvic lipomatosis — A rare disease most often seen in older obese black men with hypertension.
- Virchow's metamorphosis — lipomatosis in the heart and salivary glands.
- Dercum's disease — A rare condition characterized by painful fatty tumors in the adipose tissue commonly associated with obesity.
- Familial lipodystrophies - Multiple rare genetic syndromes characterized by loss of adipose tissue in certain areas of the body, which often cause Endocrine diseases.
