= Crystal-storing histiocytosis =

Medical condition often associated with monoclonal gammopathies

- Specialty: Hematology

Crystal-storing histiocytosis is a form of histiocytosis that mostly occurs in people with monoclonal gammopathies. Histiocytosis is an excessive number of histiocytes (an immune cell type which is part of the mononuclear phagocyte system). In the vast majority of crystal-storing histiocytosis cases (over 90%), immunoglobulins accumulate within the cytoplasm of histiocytes; in rare cases clofazimine, cystine, silica, or Charcot–Leyden crystals may be found in the histiocytes instead. Non-immunoglobulin crystal-storing histiocytosis is mostly associated with non-malignant disorders, such as chronic inflammation or autoimmune abnormality conditions such as rheumatoid arthritis, Crohn's disease, or Helicobacter pylori gastritis. It may be a localised or generalised disease. Examples of locations where histiocytosis may occur include the lungs, pleura, stomach, kidney, bone marrow, thyroid, thymus, and parotid gland. The disease is described as generalised if two or more unrelated sites are involved.

== Signs and symptoms ==
Most patients present with swellings or asymptomatic masses. Crystal-storing histiocytosis patients may also have proteinuria or progressive chronic kidney disease.

== Pathology ==
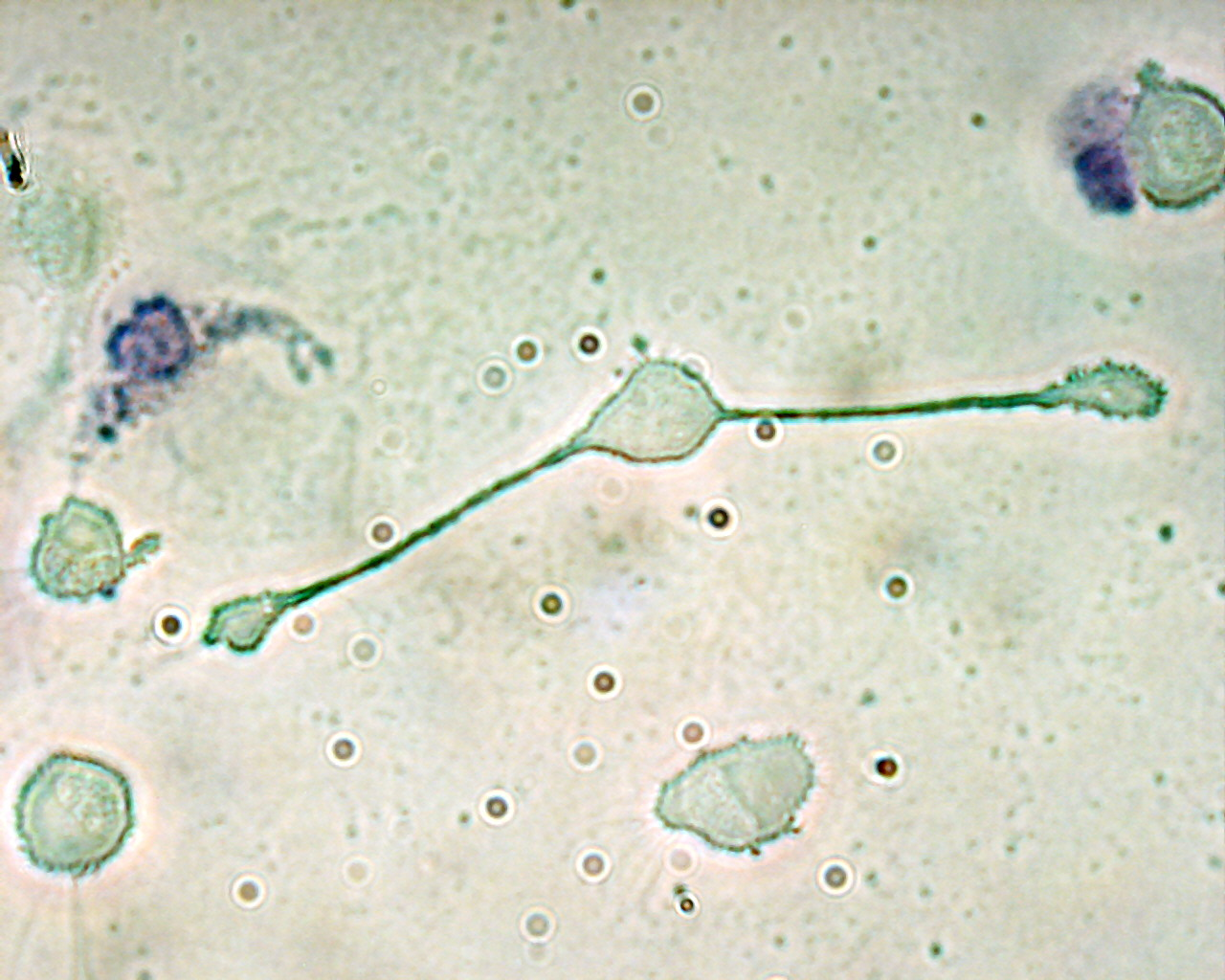
Macrophage

In crystal-storing histiocytosis, histopathology studies reveal macrophages with an epithelioid shape, small nucleoli, and round or oval nuclei. The cytoplasm of these macrophages contains crystals which are eosinophilic. The macrophages tend to be negative for S100 protein, CD1a, Langerin, and cytokeratin when immunohistochemically tested, but positive for CD68. Crystals range in size from microscopic to 4 cm, and are dense, membrane-bound, and elongated, rectangular, and/or rhomboid in shape. The crystals do not birefringe and are negative when stained with Congo red stain, but may be positive by phosphotungstic acid hematoxylin and periodic acid-Schiff (PAS) staining. The most common immunoglobulin deposited in the crystals is IgG. When the antibodies in the crystals are tested, they are almost always kappa light chain positive.

The most common locations for crystals to form are bone, head and neck, kidney, lung and GI tract. When the crystals form in the kidney, they are often deposited in the tubulointerstitium. Immunofluorescent testing, with antibodies against immunoglobulins, may be useful in patients with kidney crystal deposits.

Dogan et al. proposed a two-part classification of crystal-storing histiocytosis, dividing cases into localised or generalised. In localised disease, crystals are confined to one site, while in generalised disease, more than one site has crystal-deposits. The study was from the left upper lip and cheek which was her first pathology diagnosis in November 2010. The tumor was removed from a 51-year-old woman. Around three quarters of cases are localised, with the remaining quarter showing signs of generalised disease. Patients with localised disease tend to have better outcomes.

== Mechanism ==
Schematic structure of an antibody

Due to the rarity of the disorder, the mechanism behind the disorder is unclear, but suggested mechanisms include changes in the structure of the immunoglobulins due to the underlying malignancy (monoclonal gammopathies result in the production of aberrant immunoglobulins) or due to unusual folding of the aberrant immunoglobulins.

Other suggested mechanisms include over-production or reduced removal of immunoglobulins.

== Diagnosis ==
Clinical workup for patients with suspected crystal-storing histiocytosis includes the taking of a medical history and physical examination looking for additional locations with crystal deposits, lymphadenopathy, and hepatosplenomegaly. Laboratory testing includes a complete peripheral blood count, bone marrow aspirate, serum and urine protein studies, serum free light chain analysis, and a complete skeletal survey to detect blastic-lytic lesions and osteopenia. Even if patients do not have a monoclonal gammopathy before a diagnosis of crystal-storing histiocytosis, they are often tested to see if there is an underlying monoclonal gammopathy, due to the link between the disorders. Patients who do not have a monoclonal gammopathy at diagnosis should be regularly tested to detect if one develops.

=== Differential diagnosis ===
Diseases that need to be ruled out to diagnose a patient with crystal-storing histiocytosis include rhabdomyoma, granular cell tumor, Langerhans cell histiocytosis, fibrous histiocytoma, xanthogranuloma, Gaucher's disease, malakoplakia, and mycobacterial spindle cell pseudotumor.

== Treatment ==
Due to the rarity of the disease, there is only limited information on the optimal treatment for patients. Treatment is therefore based on the patient's symptoms. If there is an underlying monoclonal gammopathy, it is treated according to relevant guidelines. A 51-year-old with crystal-storing histiocytosis in the left upper lip and cheek had the tumor removed in 2010. A second surgical procedure was performed to validate there were no more cells of this disease. Then fifteen rounds of radiation were performed on the area where the tumor was removed. The patient was closely monitored, with no recurrence of the tumor.

== Epidemiology ==
Crystal-storing histiocytosis is a rare disorder, with less than 100 cases found in the scientific literature. The median age at diagnosis is 60 years old, but patients' ages reported in the literature range from 17 to 91 years. Patients are distributed evenly between male and female. The majority of patients (90%) diagnosed with crystal-storing histiocytosis had a neoplastic B-cell disorder, most commonly multiple myeloma, monoclonal gammopathy of undetermined significance (MGUS), or lymphoplasmacytic lymphoma.
