= THRSP =

Protein-coding gene in the species Homo sapiens

Identifiers
- Aliases: THRSP, LPGP1, Lpgp, S14, SPOT14, THRP, thyroid hormone responsive
- External IDs: OMIM: 601926; MGI: 109126; GeneCards: THRSP

Gene location (Human)
Chr.	Chromosome 11 (human)
Band	11q14.1	Start	78,063,861 bp
Band	11q14.1	End	78,068,351 bp

Gene location (Mouse)
Chr.	Chromosome 7 (mouse)
Band	7|7 E1	Start	97,062,145 bp
Band	7|7 E1	End	97,066,937 bp
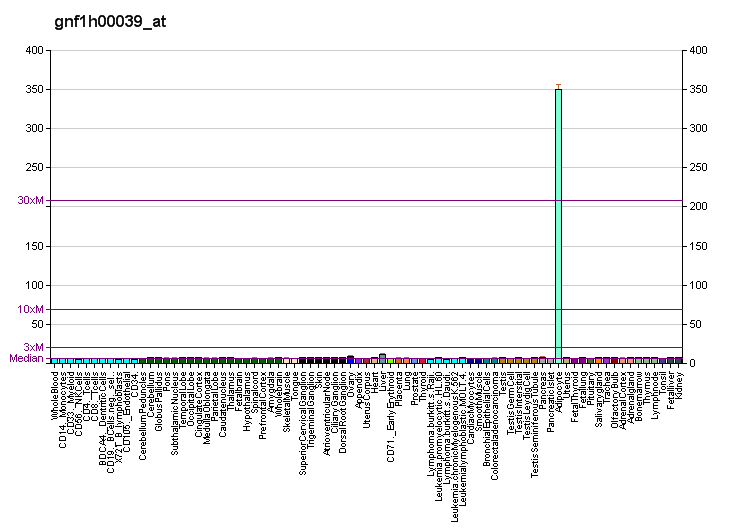
RNA expression pattern
Bgee	Human / Mouse (ortholog); Top expressed in: skin of thigh; skin of arm; vena cava; vulva; right lobe of liver; subcutaneous adipose tissue; skin of hip; lactiferous gland; parotid gland; synovial joint / Top expressed in: tunica adventitia of aorta; brown adipose tissue; white adipose tissue; lactiferous gland; subcutaneous adipose tissue; intercostal muscle; tunica media of zone of aorta; left lobe of liver; parotid gland; mesenteric lymph nodes; More reference expression data
BioGPS	More reference expression data
Gene ontology
Molecular function	protein homodimerization activity; identical protein binding; protein binding
Cellular component	cytoplasm; nucleus; nucleoplasm; cytosol
Biological process	regulation of lipid biosynthetic process; regulation of transcription, DNA-templated; transcription, DNA-templated; lipid metabolism; regulation of triglyceride biosynthetic process; carnitine shuttle; response to bacterium
Sources:Amigo / QuickGO
Orthologs
Databases	NCBI: entry; OMA: entry
Species	Human	Mouse
Entrez	7069	21835
Ensembl	ENSG00000151365	ENSMUSG00000035686
UniProt	Q92748	Q62264
RefSeq (mRNA)	NM_003251	NM_009381
RefSeq (protein)	NP_003242	NP_033407
Location (UCSC)	Chr 11: 78.06 – 78.07 Mb	Chr 7: 97.06 – 97.07 Mb
PubMed search
- Wikidata
View/Edit Human	View/Edit Mouse

Thyroid hormone-inducible hepatic protein is a protein that in humans is encoded by the THRSP gene.

== Gene ==
The protein encoded by this gene is similar to the gene product of S14, a rat gene whose expression is limited to liver and adipose tissue and is controlled by nutritional and hormonal factors.

== Tissue distribution ==
This gene has been shown to be expressed in liver and adipocytes, particularly in lipomatous modules. It is also found to be expressed in lipogenic breast cancers, which suggests a role in controlling tumor lipid metabolism.

== Function ==
Previously, THRSP was among the identified upregulated genes in the prefrontal cortex of spontaneously hypertensive rats (SHR/NCrl) and Wistar-Kyoto (WKY/NCrl) rats which exhibited inattention behavior. Subsequently, overexpression of THRSP induced inattention, but not hyperactive and impulsive behavior in mice, suggesting that this gene plays a role in the inattention phenotype of ADHD.
