= Chondroid lipoma =

- Specialty: Dermatology

Chondroid lipomas are deep-seated, firm, yellow tumors that characteristically occur on the legs of women. They exhibit a characteristic genetic translocation t(11;16) with a resulting C11orf95-MKL2 fusion oncogene.

== Signs and symptoms ==
Chondroid lipoma is an uncommon soft tissue fatty tumor that can develop in deeper or superficial tissues. It often manifests as a painless mass. The subcutis, superficial muscular fascia, or skeletal muscles of the limbs and limb girdles, trunk, head, and neck are where the majority of lesions are located. They can grow to be quite large.

Chondroid lipomas can also cause tenderness, tingling, and radiating pain. Polyps are the oral manifestation of chondroid lipoma, whereas unexplained vaginal bleeding is the intrauterine manifestation.

== Diagnosis ==
From a histological perspective, chondroid lipomas are well-defined tumors that have mature adipocytes in regions resembling lipomas and a chondroid component that has vacuolated lipoblast-like cells encircled by myxohyaline matrix.

The tumor cells stain for CD-68, Vimentin, and S-100 protein using immunohistochemistry. In certain situations, focal positive for keratin has been recorded. Chondroid lipomas are genuinely biphenotypic, exhibiting characteristics of primitive cartilage and lipoblastic development, according to ultrastructural investigations.

The differential diagnosis for chondroid lipoma includes chondrolipoma, extraskeletal chondroma, extraskeletal myxoid chondrosarcoma, myxoid liposarcoma, and lipoblastoma.

== Treatment ==
Simple lesion excision is the primary treatment for chondroid lipoma; adjuvant therapy is not necessary after surgery. Oral cavity and other sensitive areas can be treated using diode lasers for afflicted tissues. Compared to other procedures, this one has the advantages of not causing intraoperative bleeding, not requiring suturing, and having less bleeding, edema, and inflammation after surgery.

== Epidemiology ==
Although it typically manifests in the third or fourth decade of life, chondroid lipoma has a wide age distribution; two studies report similar age ranges of 16 to 70 years (median, 28 years) and 14 to 70 years (median, 36 years), with uncommon cases occurring in children under the age of ten. There is a roughly 4:1 ratio of women to men, but no racial bias is seen.

== See also ==
- Lipoma
- Skin lesion
- List of cutaneous conditions
