= Neural fibrolipoma =

Medical condition

Neural fibrolipoma is an overgrowth of fibro-fatty tissue along a nerve trunk that often leads to nerve compression. These only occur in the extremities, and often affect the median nerve. They are rare, very slow-growing, and their origin is unknown. It is believed that they may begin growth in response to trauma. They are not encapsulated by any sort of covering or sheath around the growth itself, as opposed to other cysts beneath the skin that often are. This means there are loosely defined margins of this lipoma. Despite this, they are known to be benign. Neural fibrolipomas are often more firm and tough to the touch than other lipomas. They are slightly mobile under the skin, and compress with pressure.

== Diagnosis ==
Neural fibrolipomas are often characterized by a mass under the skin accompanied with sensory deficit in the same area or a painful sensation. There is often loss of motor function in the hand as well. These lipomas are almost exclusively found in people under 30 years old. The mass is made of fibro-fatty tissue that begins encroaches on a nerve. Surgery is often needed to relieve pressure. Some common nerves that are affected are the median, ulnar, radial, perineal, and brachial plexus. Macrodactyly occurs in around two thirds of cases. Taking a biopsy of the mass is not necessary because these are distinct enough to make a confident diagnosis only from the use of medical imaging, like an MRI. However, if a biopsy is taken, it will show an abundance of mature fat cells surrounded by fibrous connective tissue. Neural fibrolipomas are often associated with carpal tunnel syndrome, due to both of their correlation with the median nerve. To diagnose this as a neural fibrolipoma, Tinel's sign and the Phalen maneuver are used to show signs of nerve sensitivity and distress on the median nerve. This, alongside imaging, can accurately diagnose these rare growths.

== Treatment ==
Surgery is often needed to remove the neural fibrolipoma. The surgeon often treats the mass as if it is carpal tunnel syndrome and does a carpal tunnel release. This surgery is paired with neurolysis and a partial excision of the neural fibrolipoma. In some cases, an entire excision may be possible. The surgeon would then begin by decompressing the nerve, and then working to excise the fatty growth, which is easily distinguishable from the nerve. Because of surgery in such close proximity to the median nerve, permanent sensory or motor dysfunction can occur, so surgery is not always the suggested mode of treatment.

== Other names ==
- Neural lipofibromatous hamartoma
- Fibrolipomatous hamartoma of the nerve
- Lipomatosis of the nerve
- Fibrolipomatosis of the nerve
- Neurolipomatosis

== See also ==
- Lipoma
- Skin lesion
- List of cutaneous conditions
