= Pelvic lipomatosis =

Human disease

Pelvic lipomatosis is a rare disease that is most often seen in older obese black men with hypertension. In pelvic lipomatosis, abnormally dense deposits of otherwise apparently normal fat may be observed in the spaces of the pelvic area. It is associated with cystitis glandularis, a precursor to adenocarcinoma of the urinary bladder. It is associated with deposition of mature unencapsulated fat in the retroperitoneal pelvic space producing the typical "pear-shaped" appearance of the bladder on CT scan. This condition also causes a straightening and tubular appearance of the rectum.
