= Hibernoma =

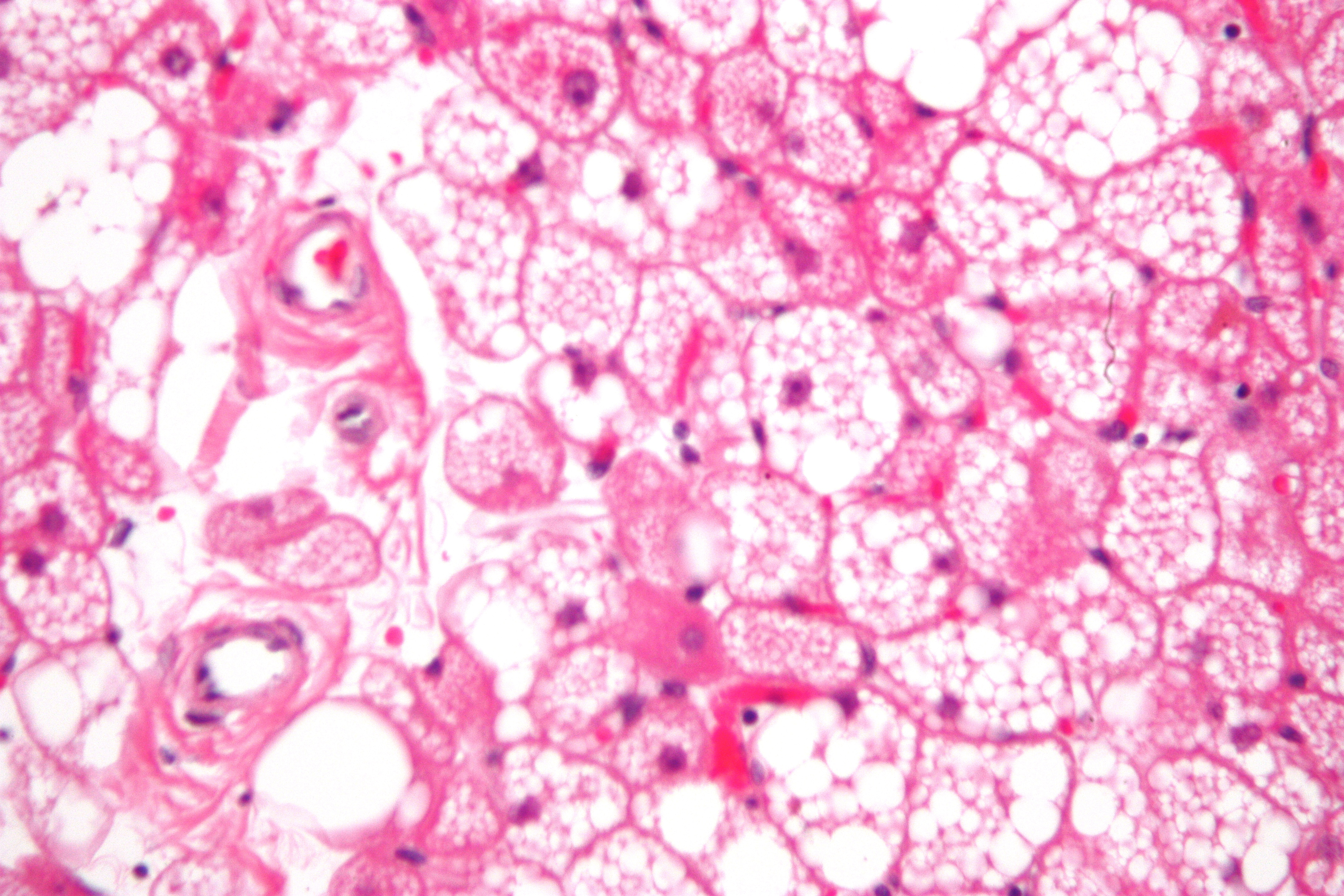
- Micrograph of a hibernoma. H&E stain.
- Specialty: Oncology

A hibernoma is a benign neoplasm of vestigial brown fat. They were first described under the name 'pseudolipoma' by the German physician H. Merkel in 1906 and the term hibernoma was proposed by the French anatomist Louis Gery in 1914 because of its resemblance to brown fat in hibernating animals.

== Signs and symptoms ==
Patients present with a slow-growing, painless, solitary mass, usually of the subcutaneous tissues. It is much less frequently noted in the intramuscular tissue. It is not uncommon for symptoms to be present for years. Benign neoplasm with brown fat is noted.

== Diagnosis ==
=== Imaging findings ===
In general, imaging studies show a well-defined, heterogeneous mass, usually showing a mass which is hypointense to subcutaneous fat on magnetic resonance T1-weight images. Serpentine, thin, low signal bands (septations or vessels) are often seen throughout the tumor.

=== Pathology findings ===
From a macroscopic perspective, there is a well-defined, encapsulated or circumscribed mass, showing a soft, yellow tan to deep brown mass. The size ranges from 1 to 27 cm, although the mean is about 10 cm.

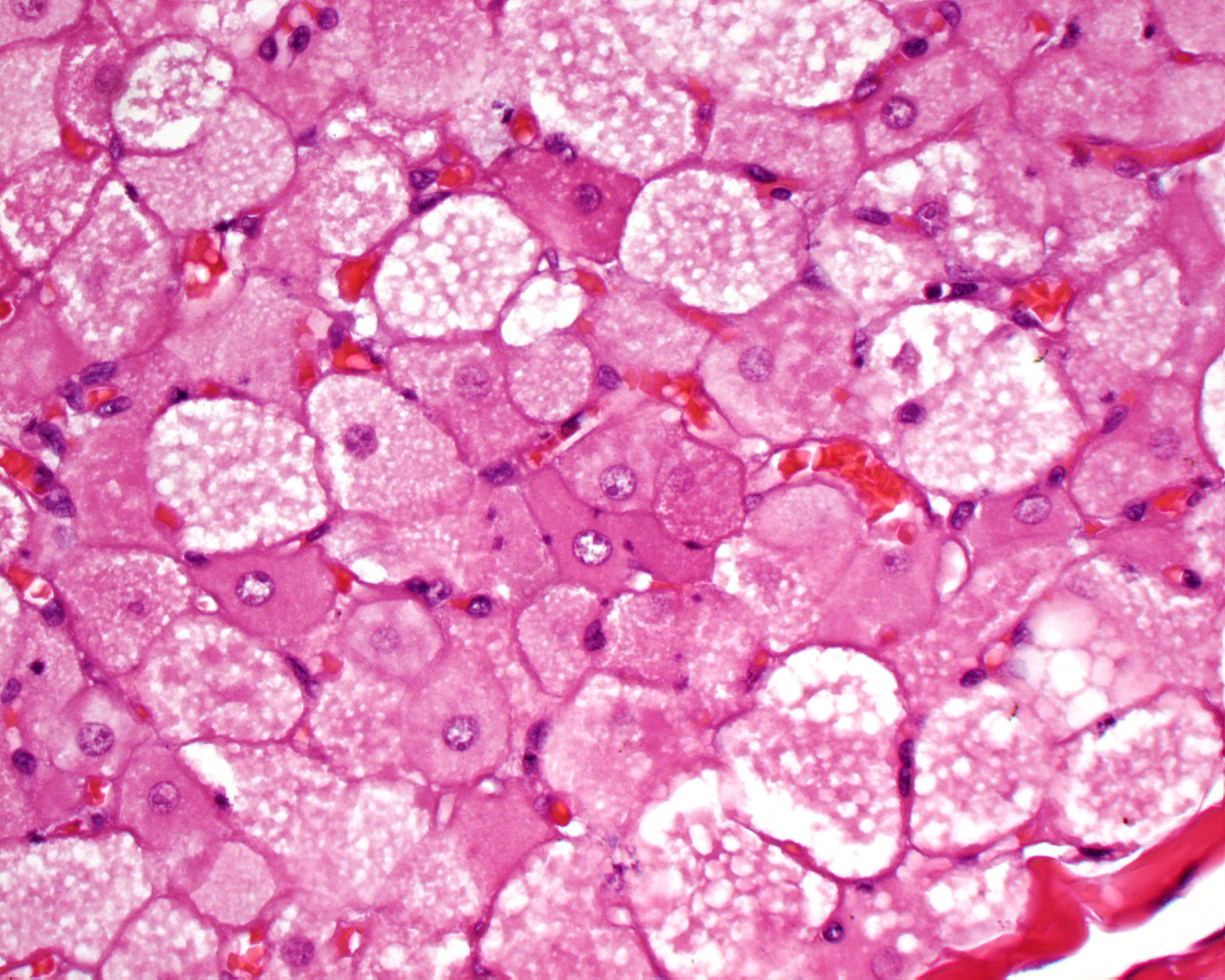
A high power hematoxylin and eosin stained photograph of a hibernoma.

The tumors histologically resemble brown fat. There are four histologic types recognized, but one is the most frequently seen (typical). There is a background of rich vascularity.

1. Lobular type: Variable degrees of differentiation of uniform, round to oval cells with granular eosinophilic cells with prominent borders, alternating with coarsely multivacuolated fat cells (pale cells). There are usually small centrally placed nuclei without pleomorphism. The cells have large cytoplasmic lipid droplets interspersed throughout.
2. Myxoid variant: Loose, basophilic matrix, with thick fibrous septa, and foamy histiocytes
3. Lipoma-like variant: Univacuolated lipocytes, with only isolated hibernoma cells
4. Spindle cell variant: Spindle cell lipoma combined with hibernoma

==== Histochemistry ====
Oil Red O-positive droplets of cytoplasmic lipid can be seen in most cases.

==== Immunohistochemistry ====
The neoplastic cells are S100 protein positive (approximately 80%), and show membrane and vacuole CD31 immunoreactivity. Uncoupling protein 1 (UCP1), a unique brown fat mitochondrial protein, is also positive.

==== Cytogenetics ====
There are structural rearrangements of 11q13-21, which are considered most characteristic. This alteration can be detected by metaphase fluorescent in situ hybridization (FISH). MEN1 gene (11q13.1) is most frequently deleted, while GARP gene (11q13.5) may also be involved.

==== Cytology ====
The fine needle aspiration smears show small, round, brown fat-like cells, with uniform, small cytoplasmic vacuoles and regular, small, round nuclei. There is usually a rich vascular background of branching capillaries. It is not uncommon to also have mature fat cells.

=== Differential diagnoses ===
It is important to separate hiberoma from adult rhabdomyoma, a granular cell tumor and a true liposarcoma.

=== Classification ===
This lesion has been called a fetal lipoma, lipoma of embryonic fat or a lipoma of immature fat.

== Management ==
Complete surgical excision is the treatment of choice, associated with an excellent long term clinical outcome.

== Epidemiology ==
The tumor is rare, affecting adults in the 4th decade most commonly. Patients are usually younger than those who present with a lipoma. There is a slight male predominance. Hibernoma are most commonly identified in the subcutaneous and muscle tissue of the head and neck region (shoulders, neck, scapular), followed by thigh, back, chest, abdomen, and arms. In rare cases hibernoma may arise in bone tissue, however it is an incidental finding.

== Additional images ==
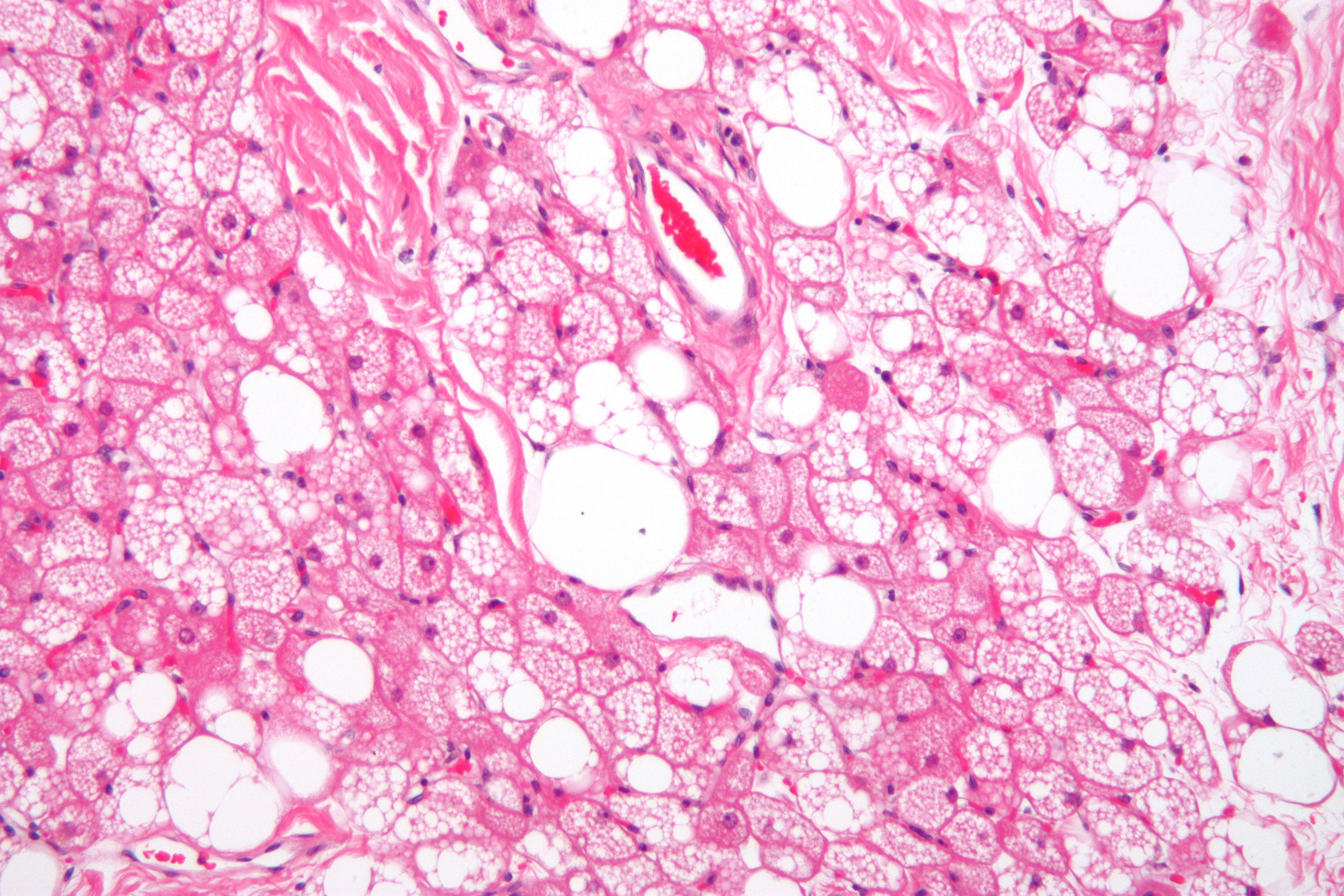
Hibernoma (intermediate magnification).

== See also ==
- Lipoma
- Skin lesion
- List of cutaneous conditions
