= Adenolipoma =

Type of lipoma that develops in sweat glands

- Other names: Lipoadenoma, peri-sudoral lipoma
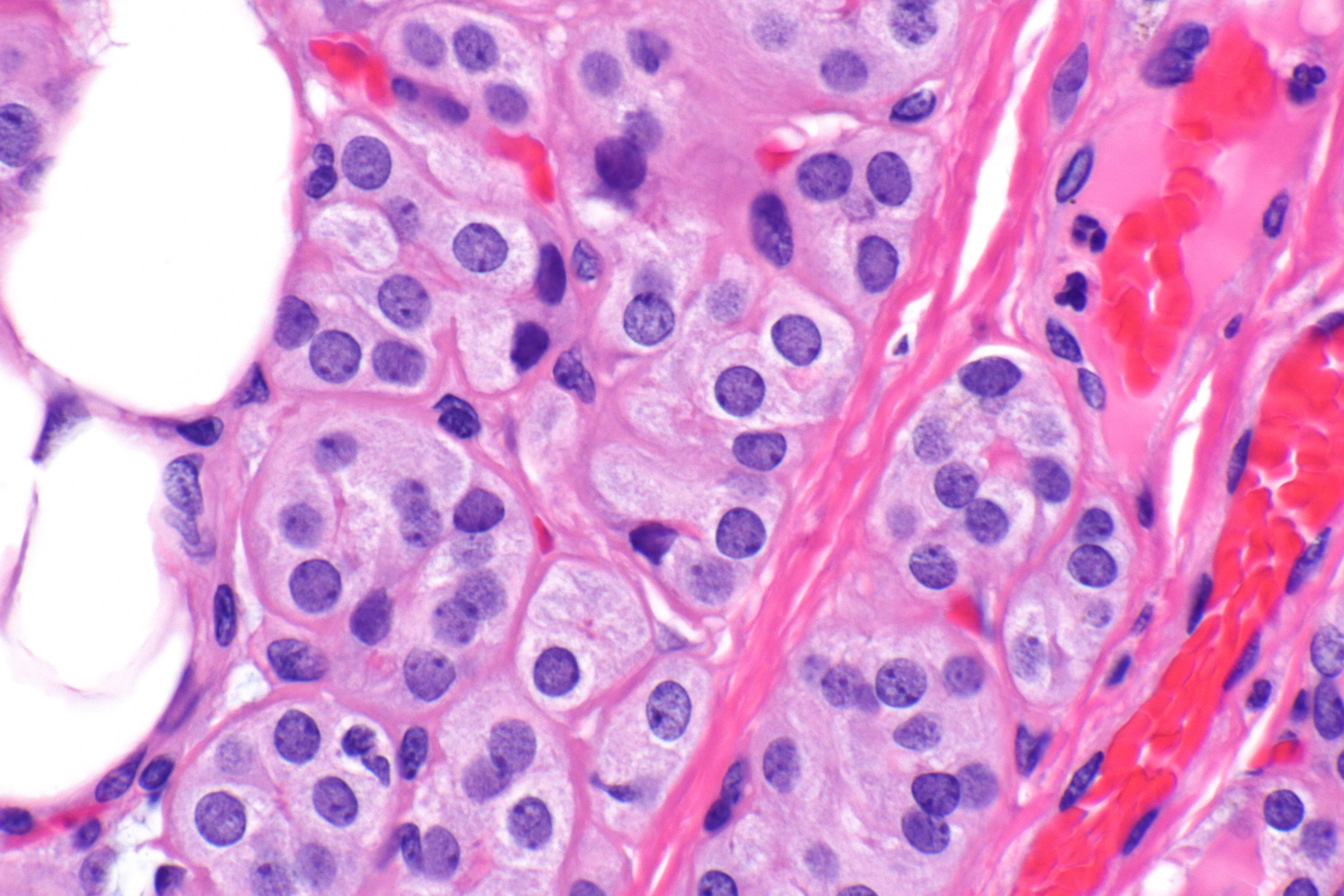
- Microscopic image of a thyroid adenolipoma
- Symptoms: Small lump, difficulty breathing
- Types: Thyroid adenolipoma, skin adenolipoma
- Diagnostic method: Surgical resection
- Treatment: Surgical excision
- Prognosis: Very good - surgery is curative

An adenolipoma is a type of lipoma (benign fat tumor) that develops in the eccrine sweat glands. They can occur either in the skin, or in the thyroid.

== Signs and symptoms ==
Adenolipomas are usually asymptomatic, soft nodules that aren't tender, and are slow-growing. In the case of thyroid adenolipomas, breathing restrictions may be present.

== Causes ==
The cause of adenolipomas is unknown. Theories include improper development in the embryo and invasion from connective tissue.

== Diagnosis ==
Adenolipomas are diagnosed by surgical resection and examining the tumor with a microscope. The presence of eccrine sweat glands are used to distinguish the tumor from a common lipoma. Size and the development of the capsule (tissue surrounding the tumor) can also aid in diagnosis.

== Treatment ==
Adenolipomas are benign tumors, meaning they have no potential to become malignant (cancerous). Surgery is curative, however, adenolipomas can reoccur.

== History ==
Adenolipomas are a relatively recent diagnosis, being first described by Hitchcock et al. in 1993 in a case series. Ait-Ourhrouil and Grosshans later made another case series, disagreeing with the given name and proposing the term peri-sudoral lipoma.
