= Rhabdomyoma =

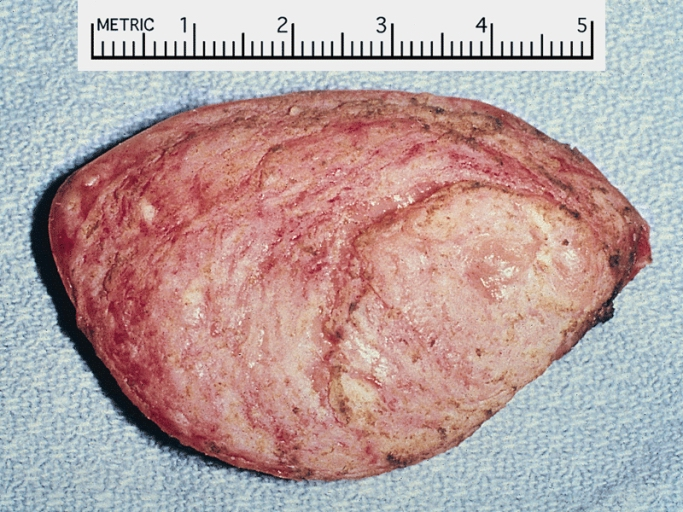
- Surgically excised cardiac rhabdomyoma (unfixed)
- Specialty: Oncology

A rhabdomyoma is a benign tumor of striated muscle. Rhabdomyomas may be either cardiac or extracardiac (occurring outside the heart). Extracardiac forms of rhabdomyoma are sub-classified into three distinct types: adult type, fetal type, and genital type.

Cardiac rhabdomyomas are the most common primary tumor of the heart in infants and children. It has an association with tuberous sclerosis. In those with tuberous sclerosis, the tumor may regress and disappear completely, or remain consistent in size. A common histological feature is the presence of spider cells, which are cardiac myocytes with enlarged glycogen vacuoles separated by eosinophilic strands, resembling the legs of a spider.

It is most commonly associated with the tongue, and heart, but can also occur in other locations, such as the vagina.

Malignant skeletal muscle tumors are referred to as rhabdomyosarcoma. Only rare cases of possible malignant change have been reported in fetal rhabdomyoma. The differential diagnosis in the tongue includes ectomesenchymal chondromyxoid tumor.

== Cardiac Rhabdomyoma ==
It is much more common to find metastasis from an alternate site than a primary heart tumor. However, primary cardiac tumors do occur. One of these is the cardiac rhabdomyoma. Approximately 80-90% of these tumors are found in patients with tuberous sclerosis, a genetic condition causing multiple tumors, with most found prior to the age of one. Although these tumors are most commonly treated with resection, symptomatic tumors in fetuses have been shown to decrease in size after maternal sicrolimus administration. If clinically silent, they can be watched with routine imaging as the tumor will likely spontaneously regress.

=== Clinical Picture ===
The specific clinical picture of a patient with a cardiac rhabdomyoma is determined by its location in the heart. However, if symptomatic, most patients will present with heart failure or an arrhythmia such as ventricular tachycardia or heart block. The severity of the symptoms will vary based on the size of the mass.

=== Detection ===
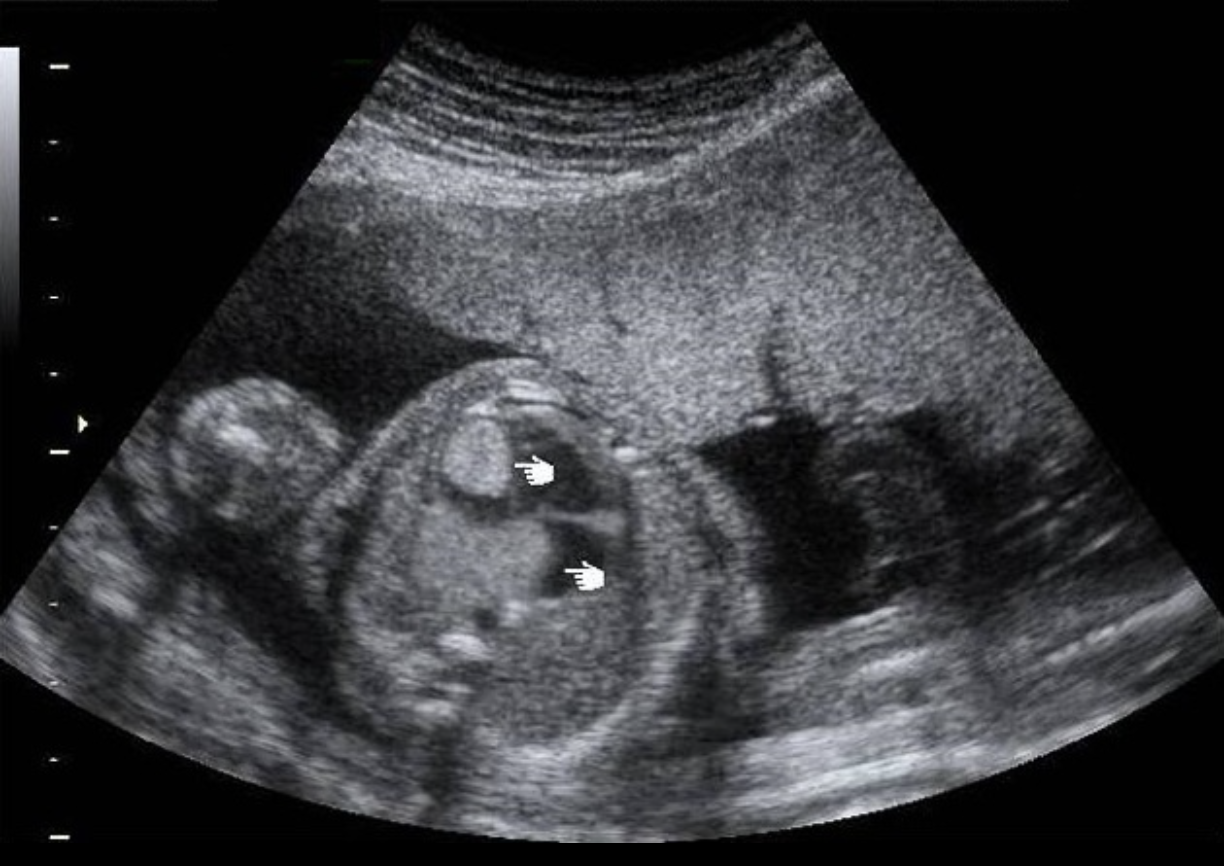
Prenatal ultrasound showing fetal cardiac rhabdomyoma

Cardiac rhabdomyomas are usually found in the ventricular walls or on the valves of the heart. With imaging techniques such as ultrasound and magnetic resonance imaging (MRI), these tumors are being detected with increased frequency and even in the prenatal period. Routine surveillance of children with tuberous sclerosis for cardiac rhabdomyoma or other cardiovascular manifestations of their disease may include electrocardiogram (EKG) and echocardiography.

== Additional images ==
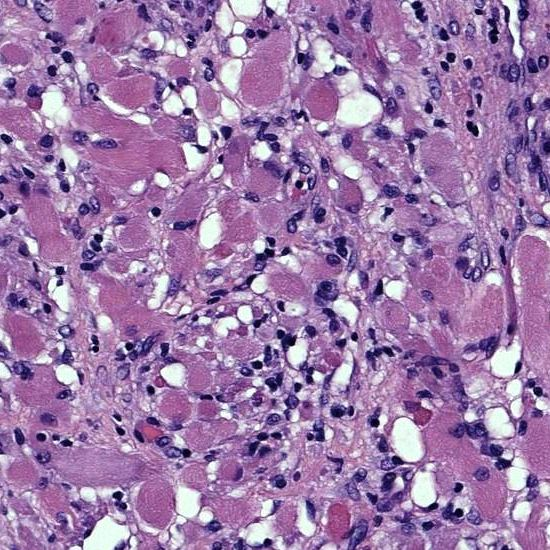
Photomicrograph of fetal-type rhabdomyoma: Note the plump, pink benign skeletal muscle cells.
