= Lipoma =

Benign tumor made of fat tissue

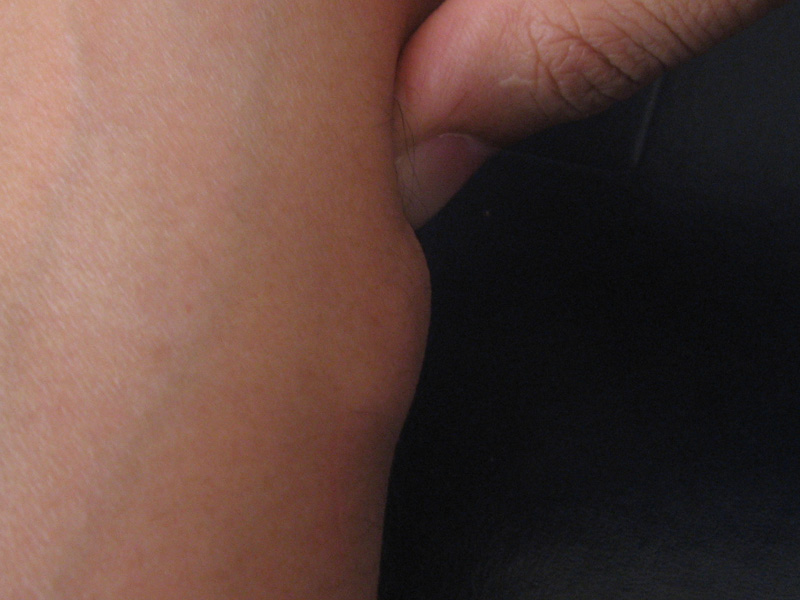
- Lipoma on forearm
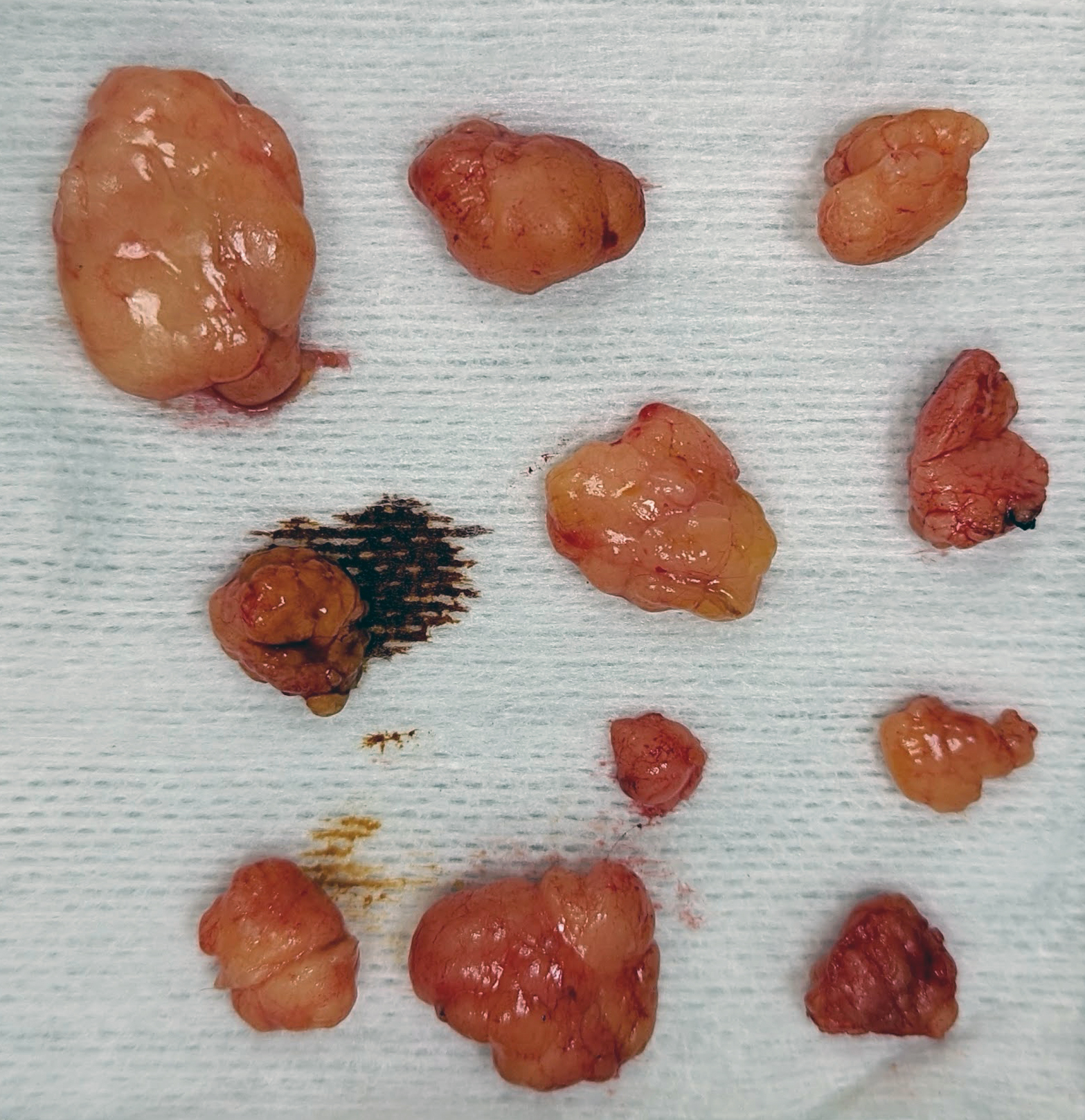
- Small lipomas which have been removed
- Specialty: Dermatology, general surgery, oncology
- Symptoms: Soft, movable, usually painless lump
- Usual onset: 40 to 60 years old
- Types: Superficial, deep
- Causes: Unclear
- Risk factors: Family history, obesity, insufficient exercise
- Diagnostic method: Based on physical exam
- Differential diagnosis: Liposarcoma, hibernoma, lipomatosis, ganglion cyst
- Treatment: Observation, surgery
- Prognosis: Good
- Frequency: ~2%

A lipoma is a benign tumor made of fat tissue. They are generally soft to the touch, movable, and painless. They usually occur just under the skin, but occasionally may be deeper. Most are less than 5 cm (2.0 in) in size. Common locations include upper back, shoulders, and abdomen. It is possible to have several lipomas.

The cause is generally unclear. Risk factors include family history, obesity, and lack of exercise. Diagnosis is typically based on a physical exam. Occasionally medical imaging or tissue biopsy is used to confirm the diagnosis.

Treatment is typically by observation or surgical removal. Rarely, the condition may recur following removal, but this can generally be managed with repeat surgery. Lipomas are not generally associated with a future risk of cancer.

Lipomas have a prevalence of roughly 2 out of every 100 people. Lipomas typically occur in adults between 40 and 60 years of age. Males are more often affected than females. They are the most common noncancerous soft-tissue tumor. The first use of the term "lipoma" to describe these tumors was in 1709.

== Etymology ==
"Fatty tumor" (plural lipomata), 1830, medical Latin, from Greek lipos "fat" (n.), from PIE root *leip- "to stick, adhere", also used to form words for "fat", + -oma.

== Types ==
The many subtypes of lipomas include:

- Adenolipomas are lipomas associated with eccrine sweat glands.
- Angiolipoleiomyomas are acquired, solitary, asymptomatic acral nodules, characterized histologically by well-circumscribed subcutaneous tumors composed of smooth muscle cells, blood vessels, connective tissue, and fat.
- Angiolipomas are painful subcutaneous nodules having all other features of a typical lipoma.
- Cerebellar pontine angle and internal auditory canal lipomas
- Chondroid lipomas are deep-seated, firm, yellow tumors that characteristically occur on the legs of women.
- Corpus callosum lipoma is a rare congenital brain condition that may or may not present with symptoms. This occurs in the corpus callosum, also known as the calossal commissure, which is a wide, flat bundle of neural fibers beneath the cortex in the human brain.
- Hibernomas are lipomas of brown fat.
- Intradermal spindle cell lipomas are distinct in that they most commonly affect women and have a wide distribution, occurring with relatively equal frequency on the head and neck, trunk, and upper and lower extremities.
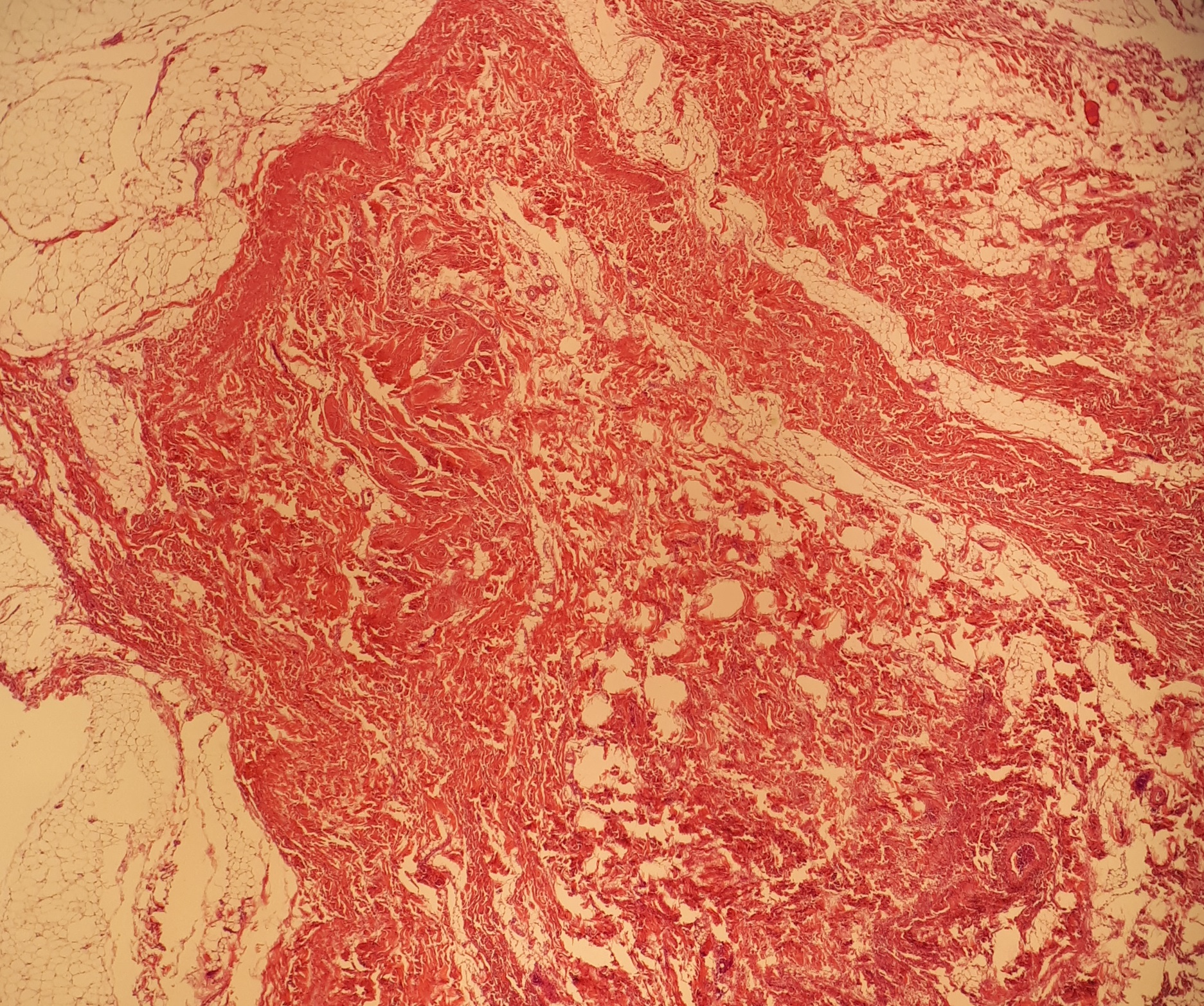
  Fibrolipoma: Large amounts of fibrous tissue
- A fibrolipoma is a lipoma with focal areas of large amounts of fibrous tissue. A sclerotic lipoma is a predominantly fibrous lesion with focal areas of fat.
  - Neural fibrolipomas are overgrowths of fibro-fatty tissue along a nerve trunk, which often leads to nerve compression.
- Pleomorphic lipomas, like spindle-cell lipomas, occur for the most part on the backs and necks of elderly men and are characterized by floret giant cells with overlapping nuclei.
- Spindle-cell lipomas are asymptomatic, slow-growing, subcutaneous tumors that have a predilection for the posterior back, neck, and shoulders of older men.
- Superficial subcutaneous lipomas, the most common type of lipoma, lie just below the surface of the skin. Most occur on the trunk, thigh, and forearm, although they may be found anywhere in the body where fat is located.

== Causes ==
The tendency to develop a lipoma is not necessarily hereditary, although hereditary conditions, such as familial multiple lipomatosis, might include lipoma development. Genetic studies in mice have shown a correlation between the HMG I-C gene (previously identified as a gene related to obesity) and lipoma development. These studies support prior epidemiologic data in humans showing a correlation between HMG I-C and mesenchymal tumors.

Cases have been reported where minor injuries are alleged to have triggered the growth of a lipoma, called a "post-traumatic lipoma". However, the link between trauma and the development of lipomas is controversial.

=== Other conditions ===
Lipomatosis is believed to be a hereditary condition in which multiple lipomas are present on the body.

Adiposis dolorosa (Dercum disease) is a rare condition involving multiple painful lipomas, swelling, and fatigue. Early studies mentioned prevalence in obese postmenopausal women. However, current literature demonstrates that Dercum disease is present in more women than men of all body types; the average age for diagnosis is 35 years.

Benign symmetric lipomatosis (Madelung disease) is another condition involving lipomatosis. It nearly always appears in middle-aged males after many years of alcoholism, but nonalcoholic males and females can also be affected.

== Diagnosis ==
A physical exam is typically the easiest way to diagnose it. Rarely, a tissue biopsy or imaging may be required. The imaging modality of choice is magnetic resonance imaging (MRI) because it has superior sensitivity of distinguishing it from liposarcoma as well as mapping the surrounding anatomy.

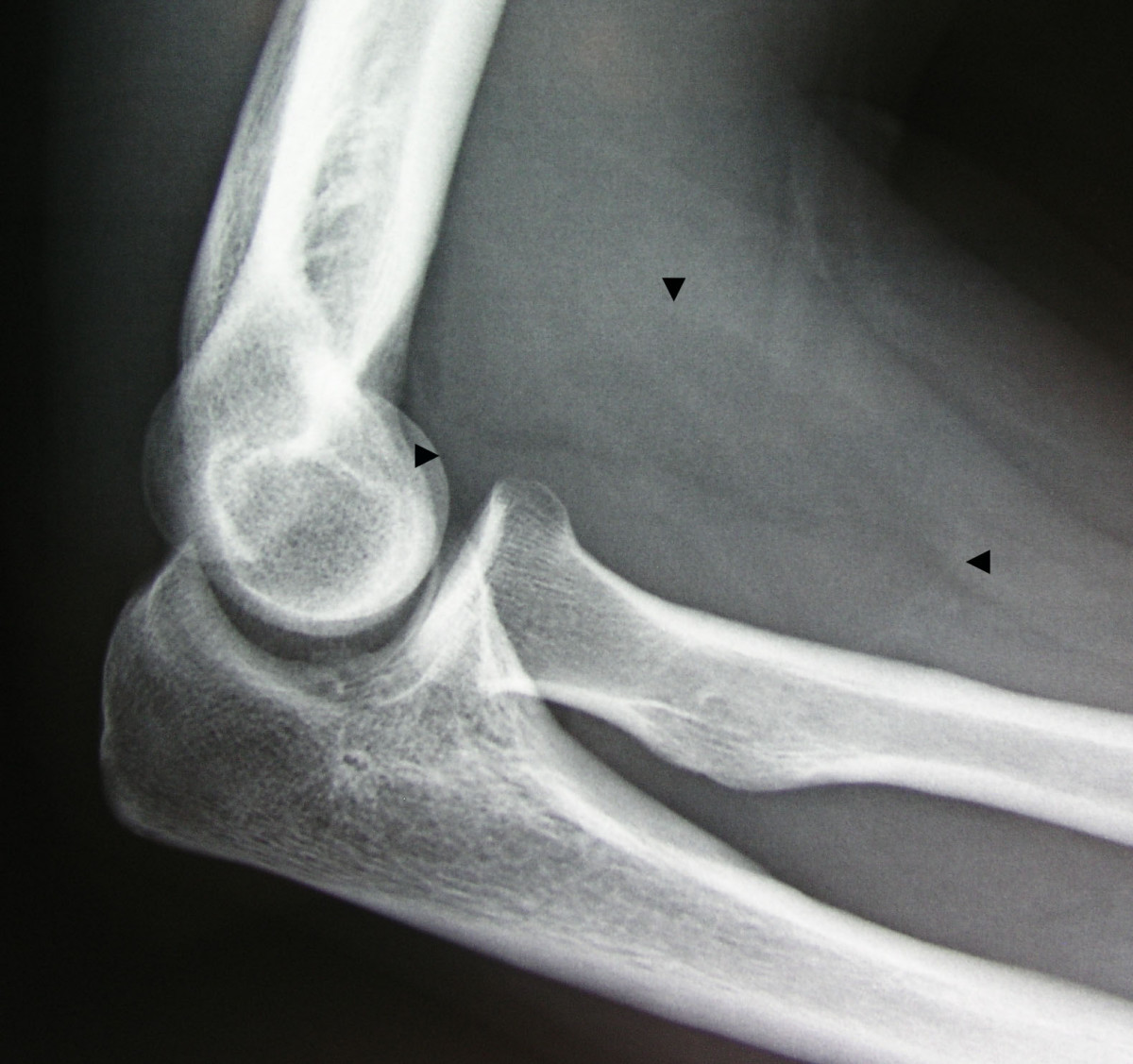
X-ray of a lipoma

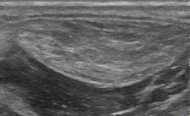
Medical ultrasonography of a lipoma in the thenar eminence: It is hyperechoic compared to adjacent muscle, and relatively well-defined, with miniature hyperechoic lines.

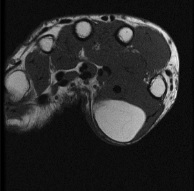
T1 MRI of the same lipoma: High intensity signal mass with regions of ill-defined margins

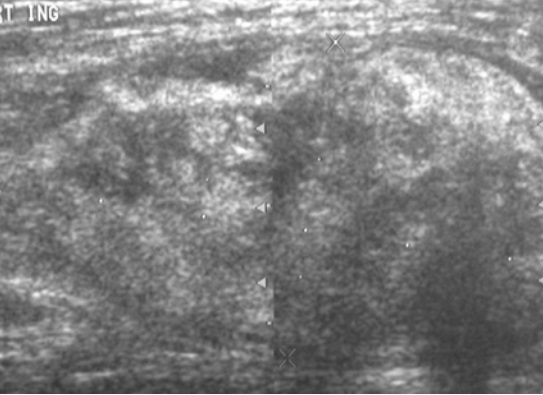
Ultrasonography of a liposarcoma for comparison: In this case a heterogeneous mass consisting of an upper hyperechoic portion, corresponding to lipomatous matrix, and areas of hypoechogenicity corresponding to nonlipomatous components.

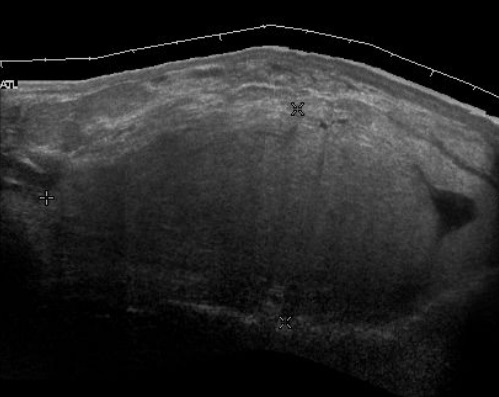
Ultrasonography of a liposarcoma mimicking lipoma. A homogeneous hypoechoic mass presenting with the same appearance of lipoma. It was clinically distinguished by having rapid growth.

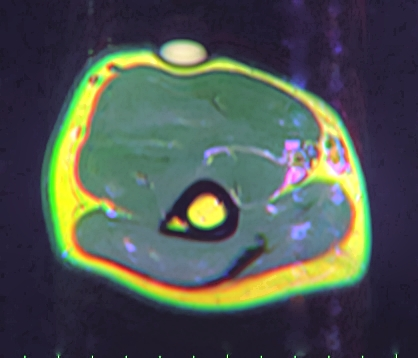
MRI showing lipoma of the arm

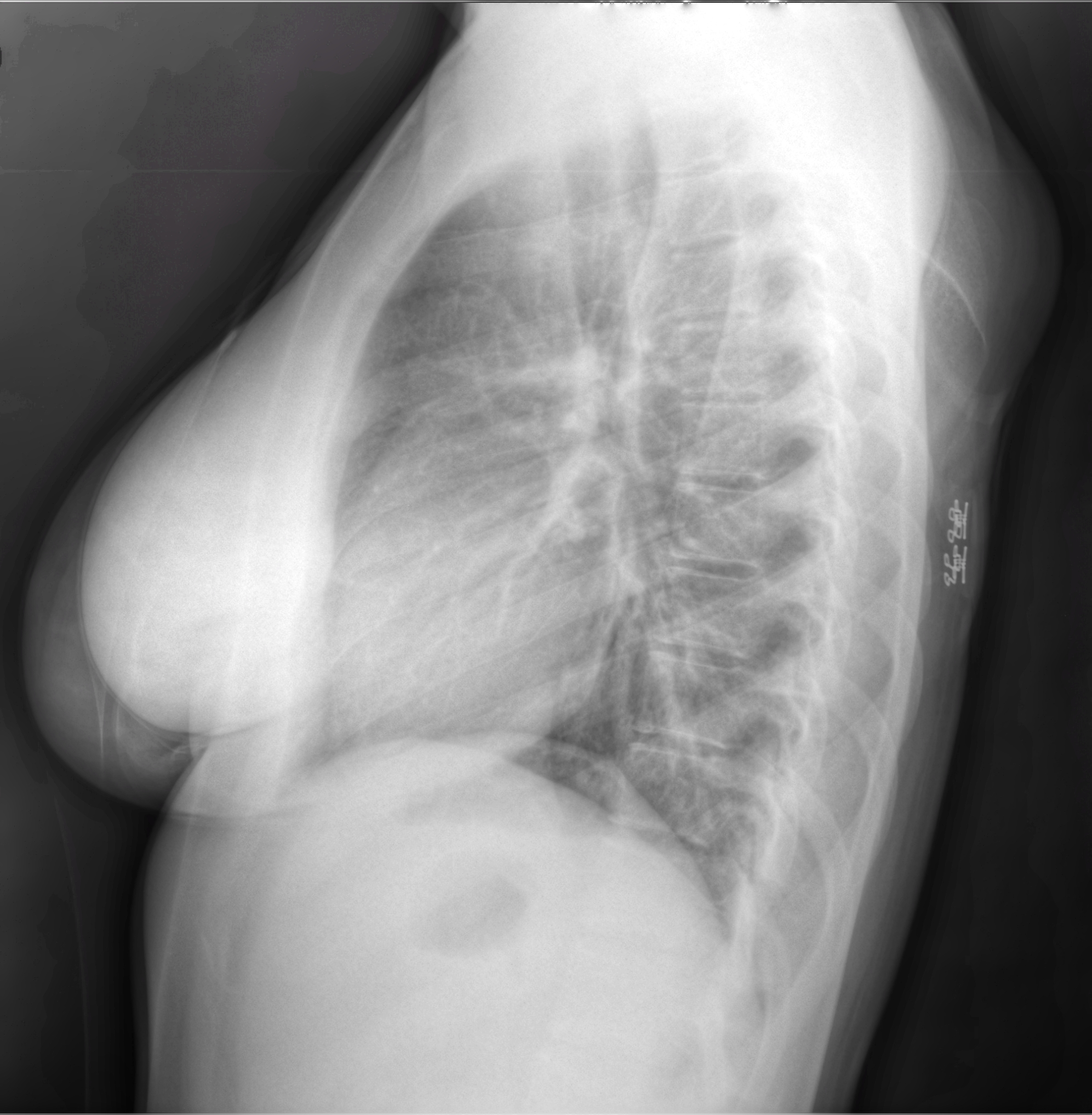
X-ray showing lipoma

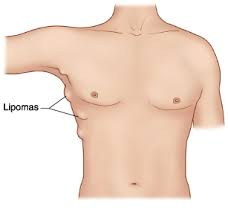

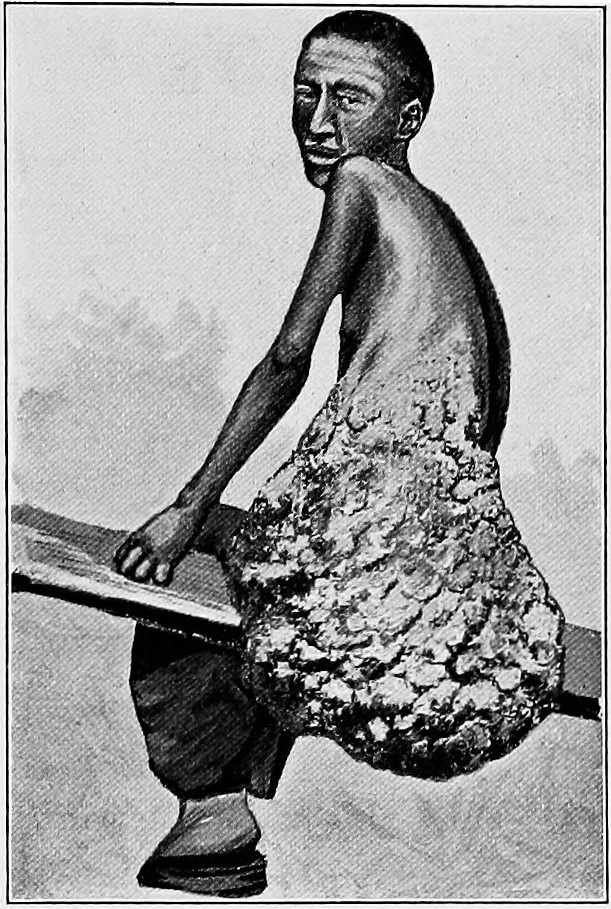
Large fibrolipoma

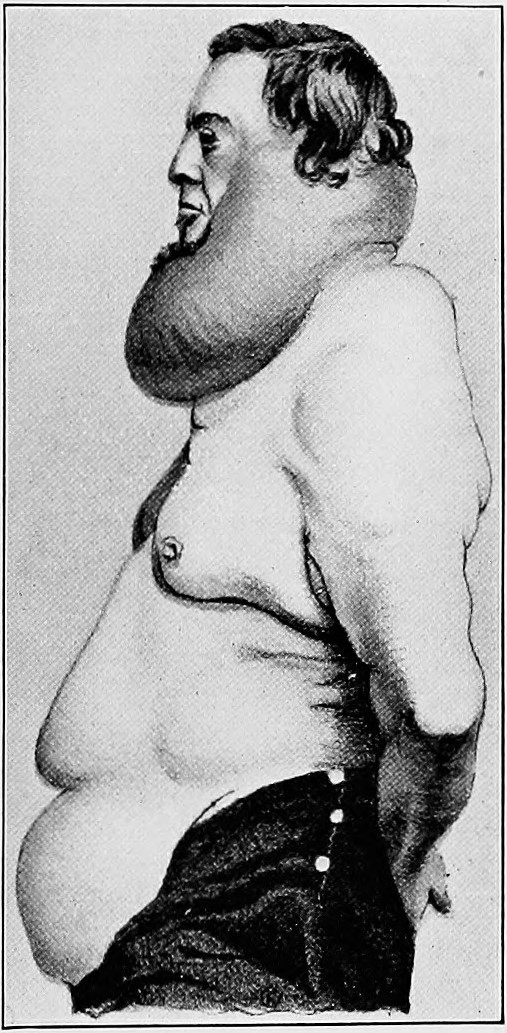
Diffuse lipomas of the neck and abdomen

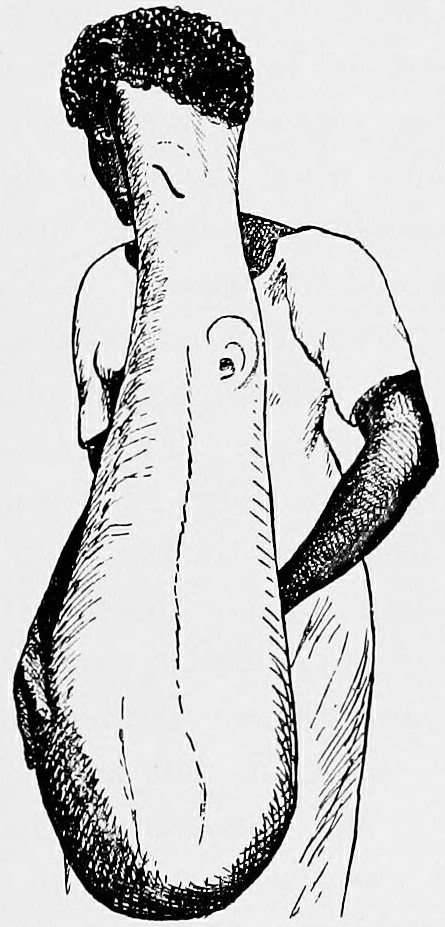
Enormous lipoma of the parietal region

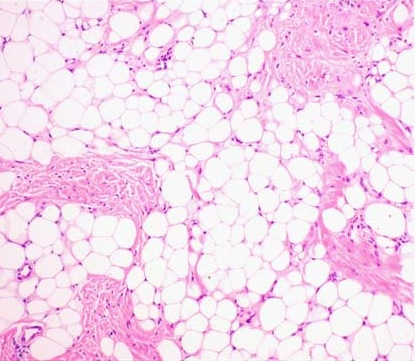
Histopathology of a lipoma: The mass is composed of lobules of mature white adipose tissue divided by fibrous septa containing thin-walled capillary-sized vessels. H&E stain.

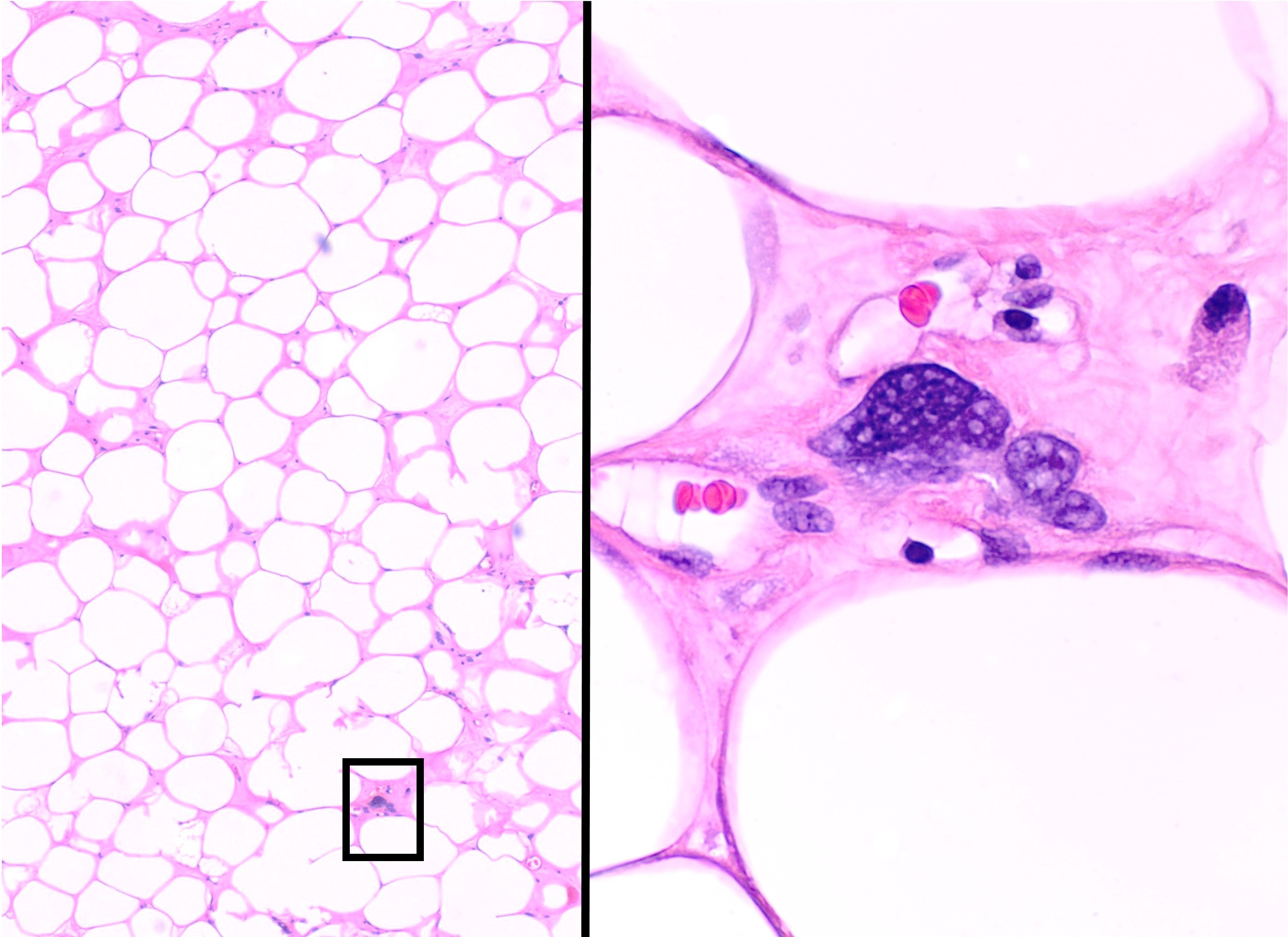
Histopathology of the major differential diagnosis of a well-differentiated liposarcoma, lipoma-like subtype: It looks almost identical at low magnification, but a high magnification of a fibrous band shows spindle cells with enlarged, hyperchromatic nuclei. H&E stain.

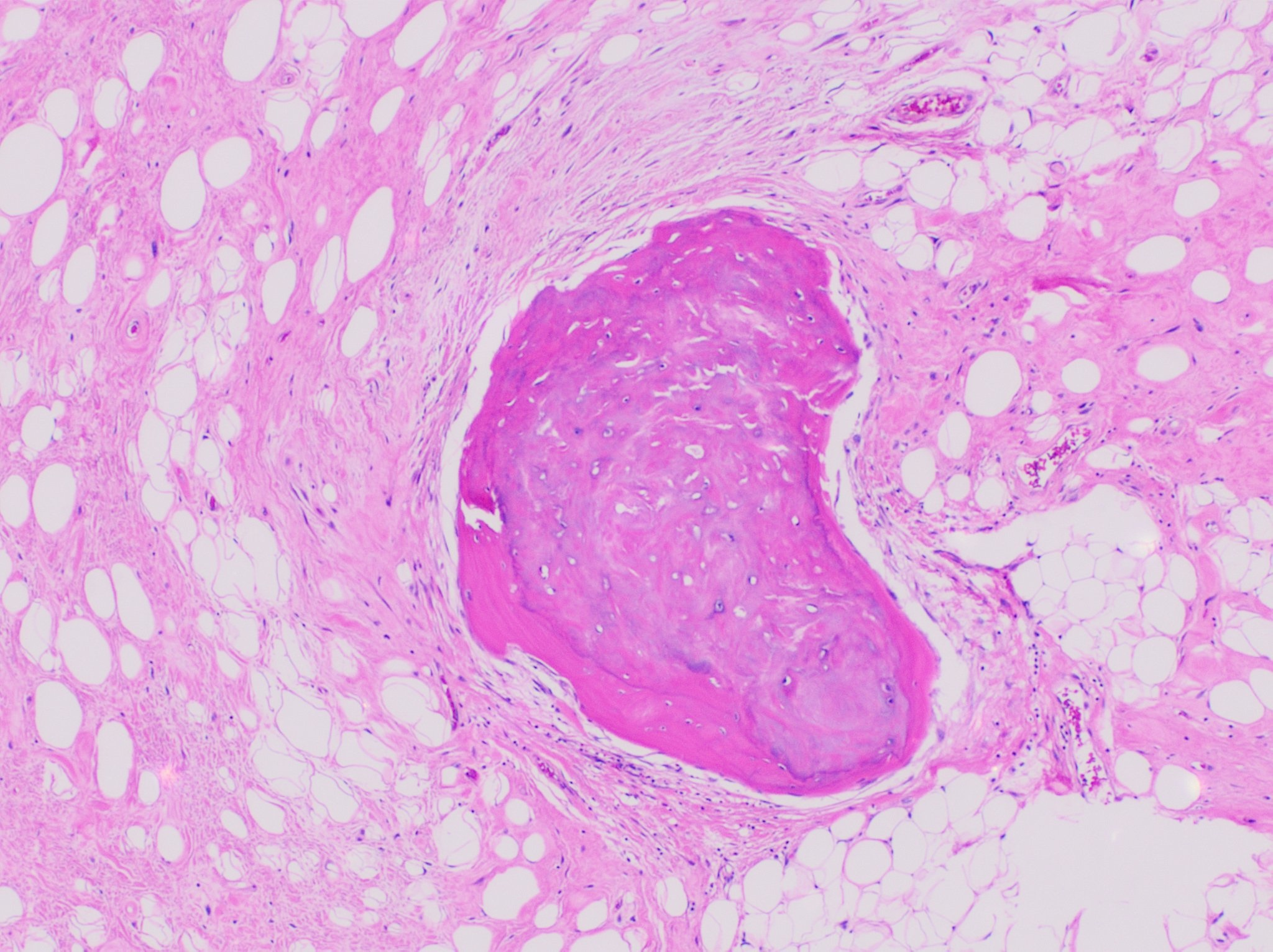
Bone formation may be seen in both lipomas and liposarcomas (a well-differentiated one pictured).

== Treatment ==
Usually, treatment of lipomas is not necessary, unless they become painful or restrict movement. They are usually removed for cosmetic reasons if they grow very large or for histopathology to verify that they are not a more dangerous type of tumor such as a liposarcoma. This last point can be important, as the characteristics of a tumor are not known until after it is removed and medically examined.

Lipomas are normally removed by simple excision. The removal can often be done under local anesthetic and takes less than 30 minutes. This cures the great majority of cases, with about 1–2% of lipomas recurring after excision. Liposuction is another option if the lipoma is soft and has a small connective tissue component. Liposuction typically results in less scarring; however, with large lipomas, it may fail to remove the entire tumor, which can lead to regrowth.

New methods under development are supposed to remove the lipomas without scarring. One is removal by injecting compounds that trigger lipolysis, such as steroids or phosphatidylcholine. Other potential methods based on tissue-targeted heating include cauterization, electrosurgery, and harmonic scalpel.

=== Post-surgery ===
Patients who have a lipoma removed are usually able to return home the same day, without any need for hospitalization. Some patients may have pain, swelling, or bruising where the lipoma was removed. These symptoms usually subside after a few days.

Resection of an intermuscular lipoma in the elbow region

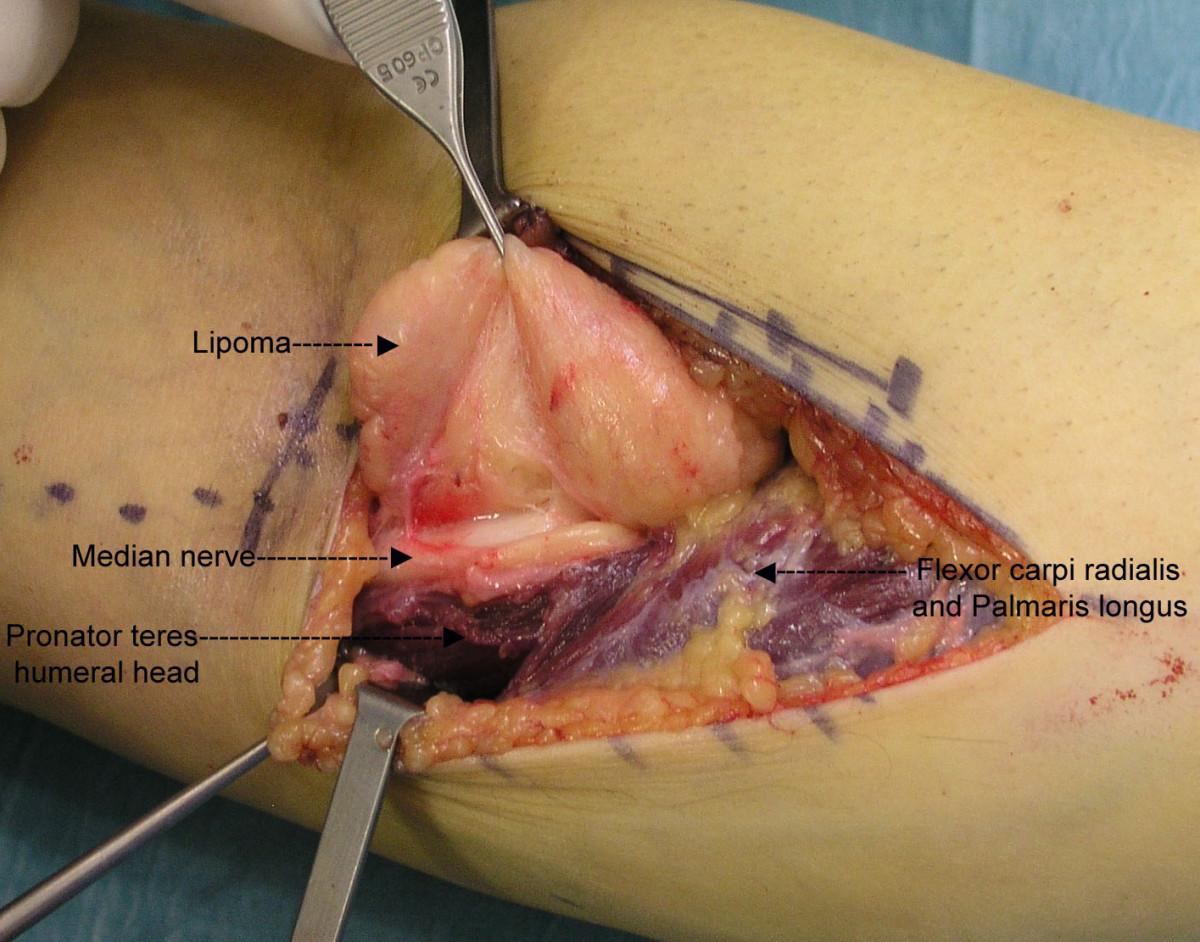
Intraoperative photo

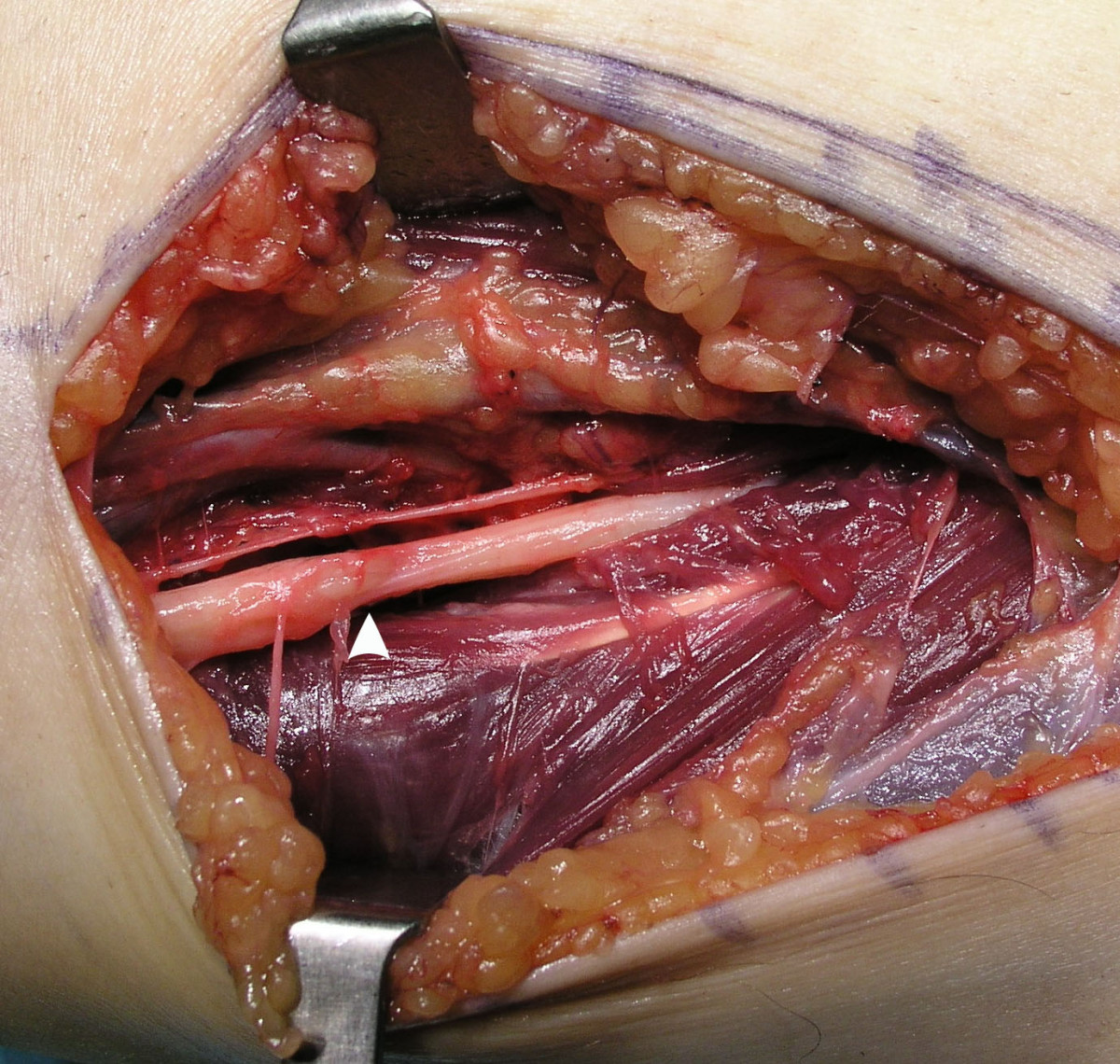
Operating field after removal of the lipoma: Arrow marks the median nerve that was compressed by the lipoma.

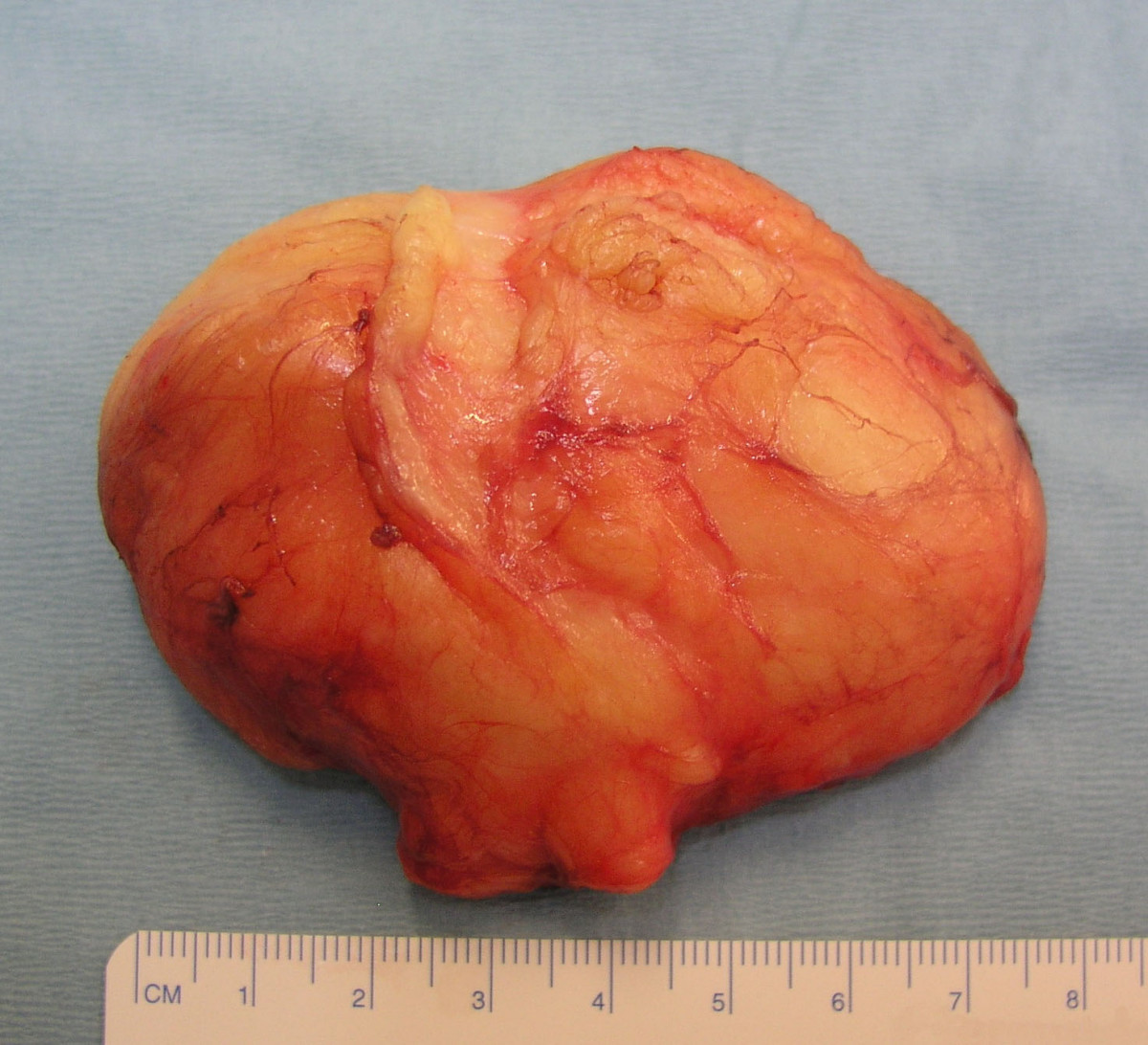
The resected lipoma
(8 cm × 6 cm × 3 cm)
Other lipomas

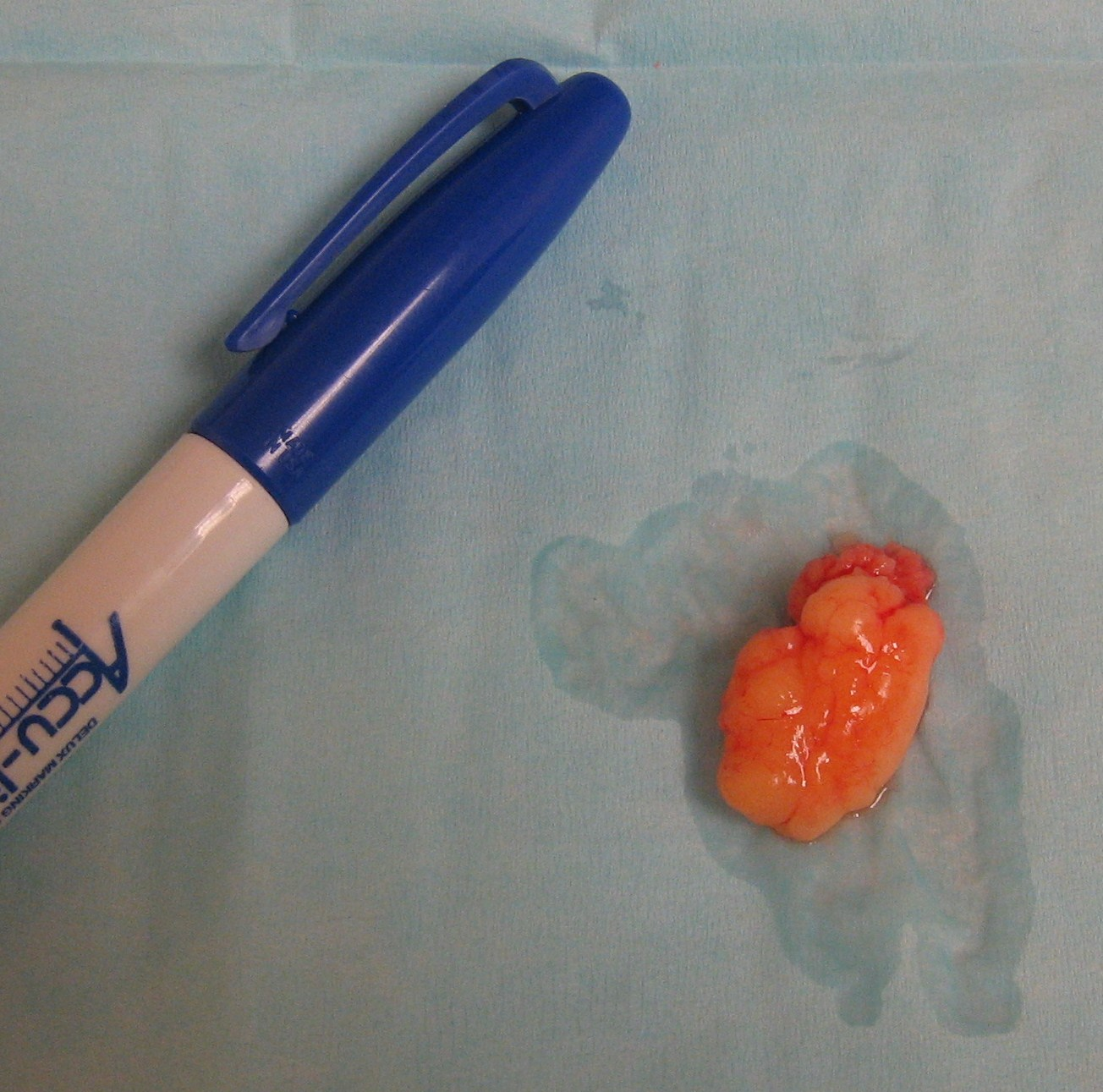
Lipoma removed from human torso

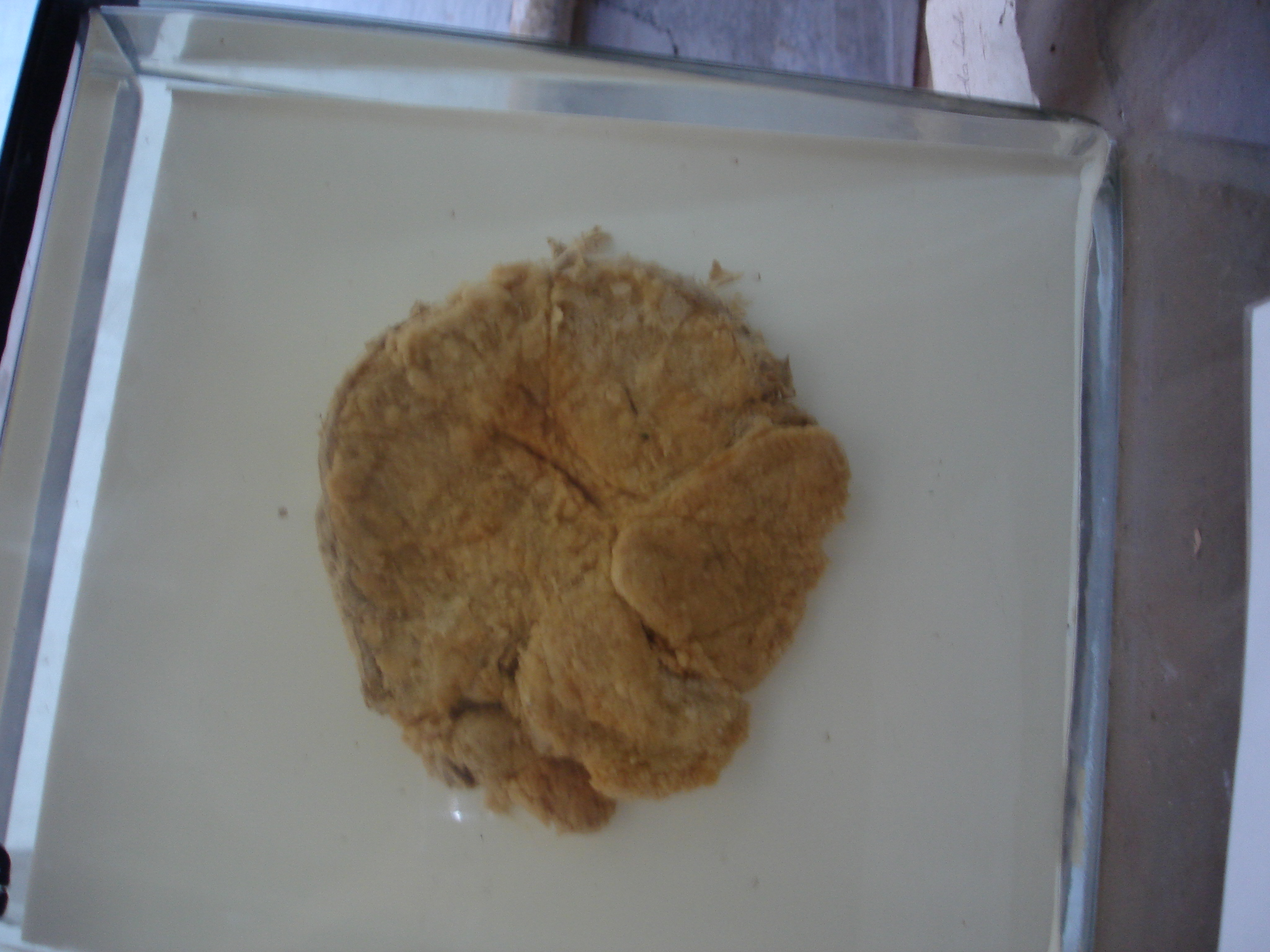
Lipoma removed from the breast

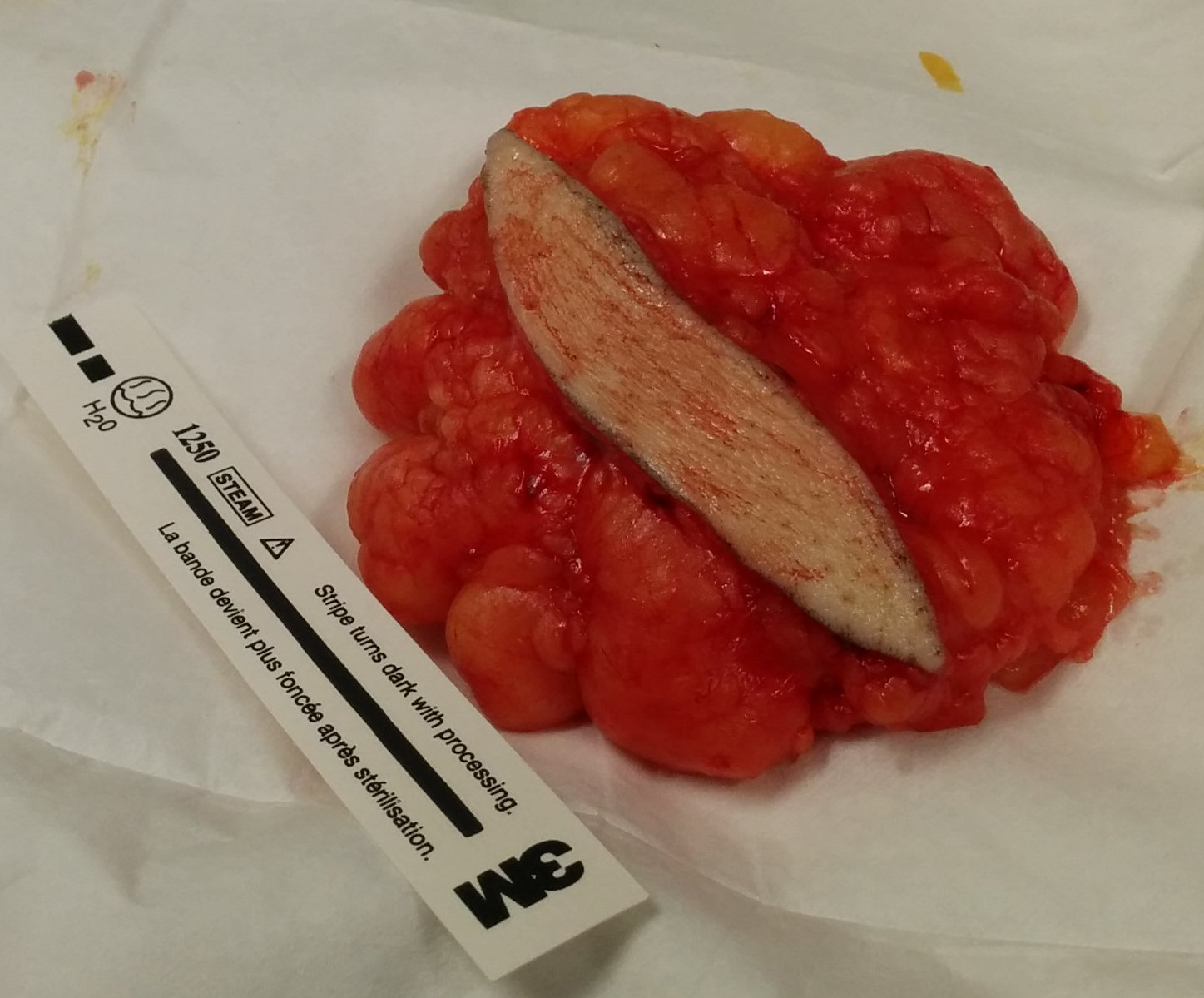
This lipoma was removed from the thigh of a 39-year-old male patient. It measured about 10 cm in diameter at the time of removal. In the center is a section of skin that was removed with the lipoma.

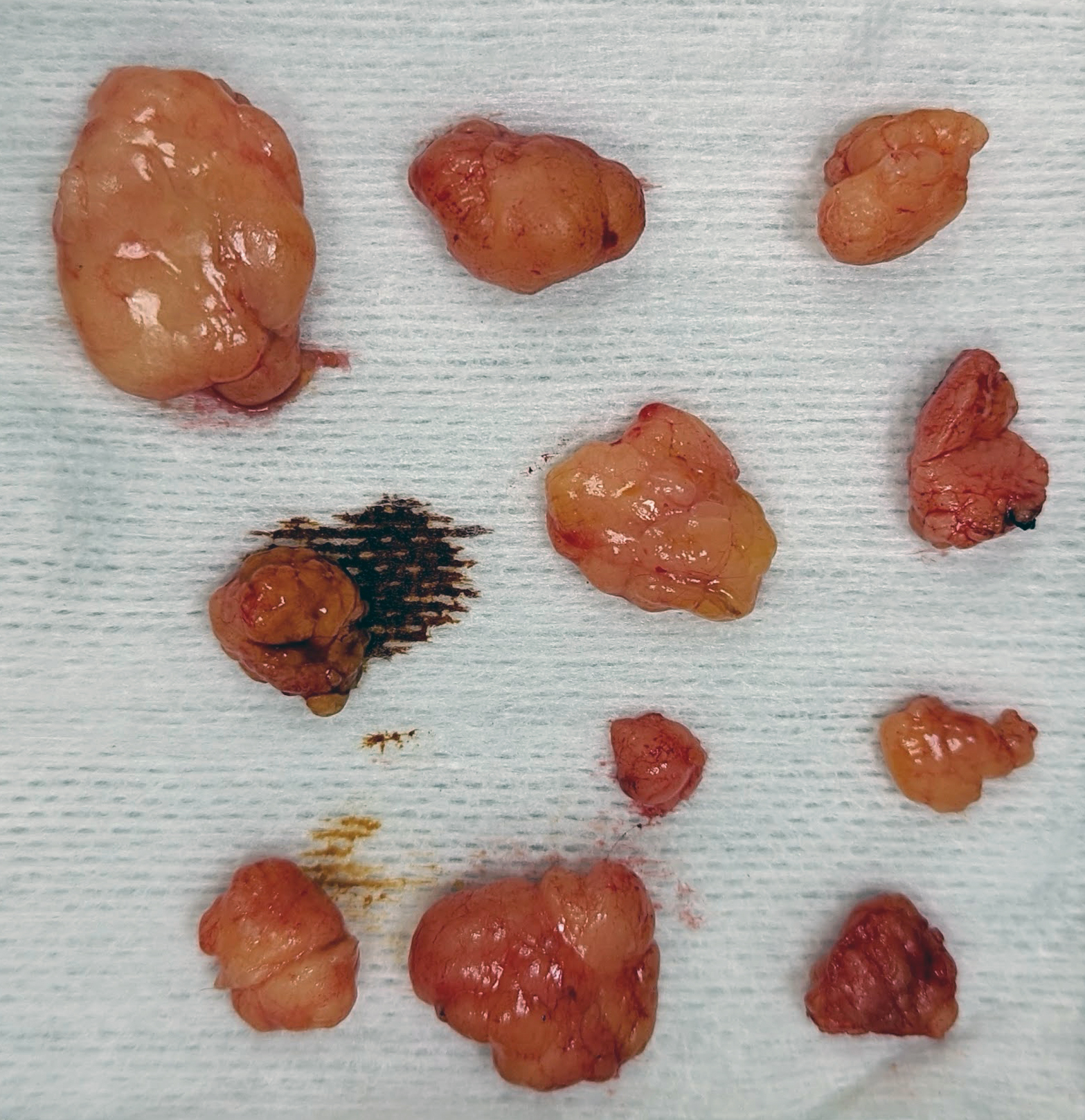
A collection of small lipomas removed from the arms of a patient

== Prognosis ==
Lipomas are rarely life-threatening, and the common subcutaneous lipomas are not a serious condition. Lipomas growing in internal organs can be more dangerous; for example, lipomas in the gastrointestinal tract can cause bleeding, ulceration, and painful obstructions (so-called "malignant by location", despite being a benign growth histologically). Malignant transformation of lipomas into liposarcomas is very rare, and most liposarcomas are not produced from pre-existing benign lesions. A few cases of malignant transformation have been described for bone and kidney lipomas, but it is possible that these few reported cases were well-differentiated liposarcomas in which the subtle malignant characteristics were missed when the tumor was first examined. Deep lipomas have a greater tendency to recur than superficial lipomas because complete surgical removal of deep lipomas is not always possible.

The presence of multiple lipomas, lipomatosis, is more commonly encountered in men. Some superficial lipomas can extend into deep fascia and may complicate excision. Liposarcoma is found in 1% of lipomas and is more likely to occur in lesions of the lower extremities, shoulders, and retroperitoneal areas. Other risk factors for liposarcoma include large size (>5 cm), associated with calcification, rapid growth, and/or invasion into nearby structures or through fascia into muscle tissue.

== Epidemiology ==
Around 2% of the general population has a lipoma. These tumors can occur at any age, but are most common in middle age, often appearing in people from 40 to 60 years old. Cutaneous lipomas are rare in children, but these tumors can occur as part of the inherited disease Bannayan-Zonana syndrome.

Lipomas are usually relatively small with diameters of about 1–3 cm, but in rare cases they can grow over several years into "giant lipomas" that are 10–20 cm across and weigh up to 4–5 kg.

== Other animals ==
Lipomas occur in many animals, but are most common in older dogs, particularly older Labrador Retrievers, Doberman Pinschers, and Miniature Schnauzers. Overweight female dogs are especially prone to developing these tumors, and most older or overweight dogs have at least one lipoma. In dogs, lipomas usually occur in the trunk or upper limbs. They are also found less commonly in cattle and horses, and rarely in cats and pigs. However, a pedunculated lipoma can cause entrapment and torsion of the intestine in horses, causing necrosis, colic, and possibly death. The intestine becomes twisted around the stalk of the lipoma and loses blood supply.
