= Granular cell tumor =

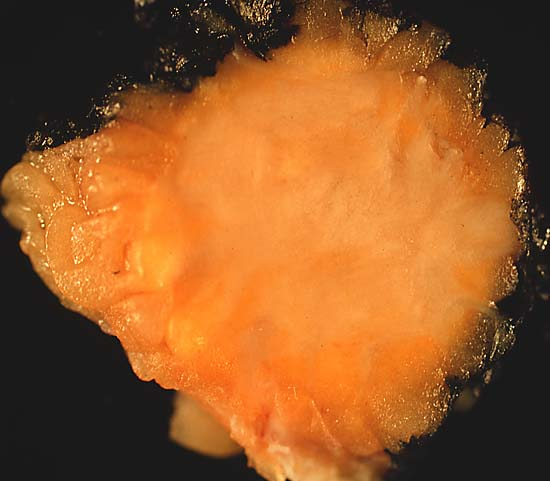
- 2-cm tumor presented as an abdominal wall mass in a middle-aged woman
- Specialty: Oncology

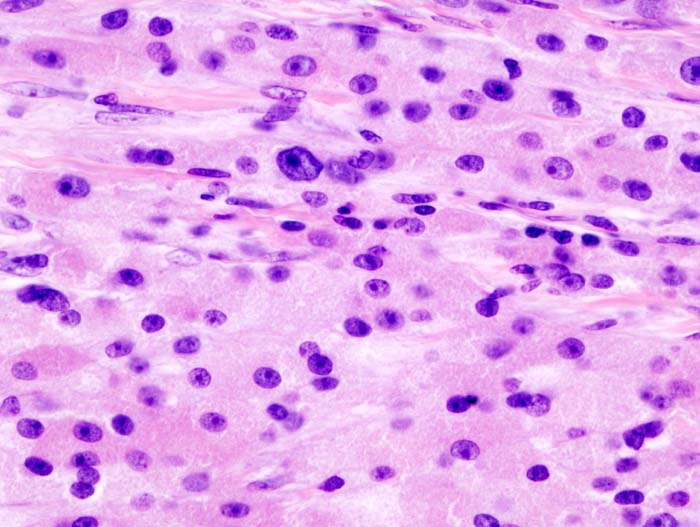
Histopathologic image of granular cell tumor of the skin

Granular cell tumor is a tumor that can develop on any skin or mucosal surface, but occurs on the tongue 40% of the time.

It is also known as Abrikossoff's tumor, granular cell myoblastoma, granular cell nerve sheath tumor, and granular cell schwannoma. Granular cell tumors (GCTs) affect females more often than males.

== Pathology ==
Granular cell tumors are derived from neural tissue, as can be demonstrated by immunohistochemistry and ultrastructural evidence using electron microscopy. These lesions characteristically consist of polygonal cells with bland nuclei, abundant cytoplasm and fine eosinophilic cytoplasmic granules. The tumor cells stain positively for S-100 as they are of Schwann cell origin. Both malignant and benign versions of the tumor exist, where malignant tumors are characterized histologically by features such as spindling, high nuclear to cytoplasmic ratios, pleomorphism, and necrosis.

Multiple granular cell tumors may seen in the context of LEOPARD syndrome, due to a mutation in the PTPN11 gene.

These tumors, on occasion, may appear similar to neoplasms of renal (relating to the kidneys) origin or other soft tissue neoplasms.

== Treatment ==
The primary method for treatment is surgical, not medical. Radiation and chemotherapy are not needed for benign lesions and are not effective for malignant lesions.

Benign granular cell tumors have a recurrence rate of 2% to 8% when resection margins are deemed clear of tumor infiltration. When the resection margins of a benign granular cell tumor are positive for tumor infiltration the recurrence rate is increased to 20%. Malignant lesions are aggressive and difficult to eradicate with surgery and have a recurrence rate of 32%.

== Epidemiology ==
Granular cell tumors can affect all parts of the body; however, the head and neck areas are affected 45% to 65% of the time. Of the head and neck cases 70% of lesions are located intraorally (tongue, oral mucosa, hard palate). The next most common location that lesions are found in the head and neck area is the larynx (10%). Granular cell tumors are also found in the internal organs, particularly in the upper aerodigestive tract. Vaginal granular cell tumors are generally rare.

Breast granular cell tumors arise from intralobular breast stroma and occurs within the distribution of the cutaneous branches of the supraclavicular nerve. As they do follow the innervation of the skin, they may demonstrate skin changes like contraction or shrinkage. Unlike traditional breast cancers, granular cell tumors are mostly found in the upper inner quadrant of the breast. They can be erroneously diagnosed as an invasive ductal carcinoma via ultrasound and mammography, therefore, it is necessary to consider a diagnosis of invasive ductal carcinoma.

The usual presentation is of a slow growing behavior, forming a polygonal accumulation of secondary lysosomes in the cytoplasm. Granular cell tumors are typically solitary and rarely larger than three centimeters. However, proliferative growth and development of an ulcer indicates likely malignancy as this type of tumor can be either benign or malignant. Malignancy is rare and constitutes only 2% of all granular cell tumors.

== See also ==
- List of cutaneous conditions
- Glassy cell carcinoma
