= Rogocekib =

Clinical data
- Other names: CTX-712

Legal status
- Legal status: Investigational

Identifiers
- IUPAC name: 2-[(1R)-1-Fluoroethyl]-5-[[6-(4-methoxypyrrolo[2,1-f][1,2,4]triazin-5-yl)-2-methylimidazo[4,5-b]pyridin-1-yl]methyl]-1,3,4-oxadiazole
- CAS Number: 2144751-78-8
- PubChem CID: 138522180
- DrugBank: DB21739
- UNII: XE88VQP94E

Chemical and physical data
- Formula: C_{19}H_{17}FN_{8}O_{2}
- Molar mass: 408.397 g·mol^{−1}
- 3D model (JSmol): Interactive image
- SMILES: CC1=NC2=C(N1CC3=NN=C(O3)[C@@H](C)F)C=C(C=N2)C4=C5C(=NC=NN5C=C4)OC
- InChI: InChI=1S/C19H17FN8O2/c1-10(20)18-26-25-15(30-18)8-27-11(2)24-17-14(27)6-12(7-21-17)13-4-5-28-16(13)19(29-3)22-9-23-28/h4-7,9-10H,8H2,1-3H3/t10-/m1/s1; Key:OENNTZBJPRRGFL-SNVBAGLBSA-N

Rogocekib (development code CTX-712) is an investigational oral small-molecule inhibitor of CDC2-like kinases (CLKs), primarily targeting CLK2 with high potency (IC_{50} of 1.4 nM). It is being developed as a potential treatment for certain cancers, particularly hematologic malignancies.

== Research ==
Rogocekib is under investigation for the treatment of relapsed or refractory acute myeloid leukemia (AML) and higher-risk myelodysplastic syndromes (HR-MDS). It has received Orphan Drug Designation from the U.S. Food and Drug Administration for relapsed/refractory AML. Rogocekib was discovered through structure-based drug design and lead optimization.

== Mechanism of action ==
Rogocekib acts as a selective inhibitor of CLKs, enzymes involved in the phosphorylation of serine/arginine-rich proteins that regulate RNA splicing. By inhibiting CLKs, rogocekib disrupts aberrant RNA splicing patterns commonly observed in cancer cells, leading to accumulation of abnormal RNAs and selective induction of apoptosis in malignant cells while sparing normal cells.

== Clinical development ==
Chordia Therapeutics Inc., a Japanese clinical-stage biotechnology company, is developing rogocekib. Clinical trials include:

- A first-in-human Phase I clinical trial in Japan demonstrated safety and pharmacodynamic effects.
- An ongoing multicenter Phase I/II trial in the United States is evaluating rogocekib in patients with relapsed/refractory AML and HR-MDS.
