= Fibrous hamartoma of infancy =

Benign childhood tumor

- Other names: Subdermal fibromatous tumor of infancy
- Specialty: Dermatology, General surgery, Pathology
- Symptoms: Benign usually painless tumor in subcutaneous tissues
- Usual onset: First 2 years of life; congenital in ~20% of cases
- Causes: Unknown
- Treatment: Surgical resection
- Prognosis: Excellent
- Frequency: rare

Fibrous hamartoma of infancy (FHI) is a rare, typically painless, benign tumor that develops in the subcutaneous tissues of the axilla (i.e. armpit), arms, external genitalia, or, less commonly, various other areas. It is diagnosed in children who are usually less than 2 years old or, in up to 20% of cases, develops in utero and is diagnosed in an infant at birth.

The cells involved in FHI include bland fibroblasts, myofibroblasts, mature fat cells, and primitive-appearing spindle-shaped and/or star-shaped cells. The tumor was first described by R.D. Reye in 1956 who termed the disorder "subdermal fibromatous tumor of infancy" and regarded it as a reactive lesion. In a 1964 study of 30 patients, F.M. Enzinger renamed the tumor hamartoma of infancy; he regarded it to be a hamartoma (i.e. a local malformation of various normal cell types due to a systemic genetic condition) rather than a reactive lesion. However, subsequent studies have found gene mutations in FHI tumor cells and conclude that it is a true neoplasm, i.e. a growth of cells which is uncoordinated with that of the normal surrounding tissue and persists in growing abnormally even if the original trigger is removed. In 2020, the World Health Organization classified FHI in the category of benign fibroblastic and myofibroblastic tumors.

Fibrous hamartoma of infancy is generally a benign tumor but may be locally aggressive, locally infiltration, and in uncommon cases produce symptoms such as tenderness. Surgical excision is the treatment of choice for FHI tumors.

== Presentation ==
The largest study to date examined 197 cases of FHI. In this study, most individuals presented with a slowly growing, symptomless, subcutaneous mass although rarely these masses were rapidly growing, and/or were tender, painful, warm, and/or were accompanied by skin changes, pigmentation, sweat gland enlargement, and/or increased hair overlaying the tumor. Sixty-eight percent of these cases were diagnosed in the first year of life, 23% were diagnoses at birth, and 9% were diagnosed in children 2–5 years old. The male-to female ratio was 2.4. The tumors were most common in the axilla (23% of cases), upper arm (12.5%), lower arm (10.5%), external genitalia area (9.5%), and inguinal region (7.5%); less common or rare sites for these tumors were the buttocks, back of the head, back of the neck, back of the torso, lower arm, leg, foot, chest, and anal area. Most cases presented as solitary masses but 3 cases presenting with 2 tumors and 1 case presenting with 5 tumors. Overall, the size of these tumors varied between 0.5 and 4.0 cm but in rare cases were as large as 20 cm. Two subsequent studies of 145 and 60 individuals agreed with all of these results but also did diagnose FHI in individuals as old as 8 and 14 years, respectively.

== Pathology ==
On gross pathological examination, FHI tumors are soft, poorly demarcated, fibro-fatty masses located in subcutaneous tissues. These tumor masses tend to blend with the surrounding fat tissues, may be lobulated, and in rare cases, especially when large, extend into nearby muscles, nerves, and/or fibrous/connective tissue structures. Microscopic histopathological analyses of hematoxylin and eosin stained FHI tumor tissues consistently reveal three very different component zones in virtually all cases:

- haphazardly arranged, intersecting bundles of bland fibroblast-like/myofibroblast-like cells
- mature adipose (i.e. fat) tissue
- highly vascular, myxoid (i.e. connective tissue appearing more blue or purple than normal connective) nodules of primitive-appearing spindled-shaped to star-shaped cells.

Chronic inflammatory cell (e.g. lymphocytes, macrophages, and plasma cells) aggregates are commonly present in these lesion. The relative proportion of fibroblast/myofibroblast, adipose tissue, and myxoid zones commonly vary from case to case.

Earlier immunohistochemical analyses of FHI tumor tissues in a small number of cases have given varying results. A more recent and larger study reported that 75% of tested cases showed variable expression of smooth muscle actin proteins by the cells located primarily in fibroblast/myofibroblast zones and occasionally by the cells located in myxoid zones; the S100 protein was expressed by the fat cells of the adipose tissue zone in all cases; CD34 protein was expressed by the cells in myxoid and fibroblast/myofibroblast zones in all cases; and cells expressing the desmin protein were not detected in any case. A smaller, more recent study also found that 8 of 13 FHI cases had tumor cells in the fibroblast/myofibroblast zone that expressed smooth-muscle actin protein, 6 of 8 cases had tumor cells in the myxoid zone that expressed the CD34 protein, and 7 of 7 cases had tumor cells in the adipose tissue zone express the S100 protein. The expression pattern of one or more of these proteins has not yet been found to be of help in distinguishing FHI from other tumor types.

== Chromosome and gene abnormalities ==
The EGFR gene which codes for the production of the epidermal growth factor receptor protein is located at band 11.2 on the short (or "p") arm of chromosome 7. Studies using next-generation sequencing targeted to the EGFR gene chromosomal area and confirmed by Sanger sequencing have detected insertion and/or deletion mutations in exon 20 of this gene in the tumor cells of 13 of 13 test FHI cases. While the activity of the normal EGFR protein is blocked by tyrosine kinase inhibitor drugs, most proteins coded by EGFR exon 20-mutated genes do not respond to these drugs due the structural configuration of their EGFR kinase domains; however, certain protein variants coded by these mutated EGFR genes may still be sensitive, and offer a potential treatment option, for a subset of FHI cases. In any event, the identification of these EGFR can help distinguish FHI from other pediatric spindle cell neoplasms with morphologies similar to FHI such as giant cell fibroblastoma.

Genomic microarray analyses performed on the two FHI cases with tumors that had areas of sarcoma-like morphology found sarcoma-like cells hyperdiploid (i.e. cell with at least 2 more chromosomes than the normal 48), near tetraploid (i.e. four instead of the normal two chromosomes for some but not all chromosomes), single chromosome gains for several chromosomes, and loss of heterozygosity in the p arms of chromosomes 1 and 11 in the first case and in the second case a loss of the p arm in chromosome 10, lose of chromosome 14, and lose of a portion of the q arm of chromosome 22q. These two cases along with recurrent EGFR gene abnormalities strongly support the notation that FHI is as neoplastic tumor.

== Diagnosis ==
The diagnosis of FHI is dependent on its presentation as a subcutaneous tumor that often occurs in individuals at birth or ages <1–2 years old; its highly characteristic histopathology consisting of fibroblast/myofibroblast, adipose tissue, and myxoid zones; and its content of tumor cells which have one of the EGFR gene mutations described in the previous section. The combination of these factors clearly distinguishes FHI from three recently defined tumors (i.e. fibroblastic connective tissue nevus, medallion-like dermal dendrocyte hamartoma, and plaque-like CD34-positive dermal fibroma) as well as various pediatric spindle-shaped cell neoplasms. Tumor imaging methods such as magnetic resonance imaging may also be helpful in suggesting that a tumor is an FHI.

== Treatment and prognosis ==
FHI tumors, if left untreated, have been documented to grow for as long as ~5 years following their diagnosis. The treatment of choice for these tumors is complete surgical excision with clear margins (i.e. with removal of all tumor tissue). Recurrence rates at the site of excision in several studies have been ~15% although rates as low as 1% have been reported by specialized centers. These tumors do not metastasize and have an excellent long-term prognosis.

== See also ==
- List of cutaneous conditions
- Skin lesion
