= Cellular angiofibroma =

- Specialty: Gynecology, Urology, Dermatology, Pathology, General surgery
- Symptoms: Growth of a painless, soft tissue tumor in vulva-vaginal, inguinal-scrotal, or other areas
- Complications: Extremely rare recurrence after surgical removal
- Usual onset: Adults >30 years old
- Types: Benign tumor
- Causes: Unknown
- Treatment: Surgical resection
- Prognosis: Excellent
- Frequency: Rare
- Deaths: None

Cellular angiofibroma (CAF) is a rare, benign tumor of superficial soft tissues that was first described by M. R. Nucci et al. in 1997. These tumors occur predominantly in the distal parts of the female and male reproductive systems, i.e. in the vulva-vaginal and inguinal-scrotal areas, respectively, or, less commonly, in various other superficial soft tissue areas throughout the body. CAF tumors develop exclusively in adults who typically are more than 30 years old.

CAF tumors are composed of bland mesenchymal spindle-shaped cells in an edematous (i.e. abnormally swollen with fluid) to fiber-laded connective tissue background. Mesenchymal cells are cells in the cell lineage that includes fibroblasts, adipocytes (i.e. fat cells), macrophages, mast cells, leucocytes, and the precursor cells which mature into these cell types. In 2020, the World Health Organization classified cellular angiofibroma tumors in the category of benign fibroblastic and myofibroblastic tumors.

CAF tumors rarely recur after surgical removal and do not metastasize to distant tissues. Accordingly, surgical resection is the commonly performed and current standard for treating these tumors.

== Presentation ==
CAF tumors commonly present as painless, slowly growing, soft tissue nodules or masses in the vulva-vaginal and inguinal-scrotal areas; less commonly in the perineum; and rarely in the urethra, pelvis, anus, retroperitoneum, lumbar region, middle of the trunk, rectum, oral mucosa, knee, upper eyelid, hip, chest wall, axilla, breasts, and upper abdomen. The tumors are generally centered in the subcutaneous tissue or in the case of internal tumors, such as those located in the mouth, urethra, rectum, or anus, the submucosa. In one study of 51 individuals, these tumors had been noticed for 1 week to 5 years (median time: 5 months) prior to diagnosis in women (median age: 47 years) and men (median age: 60 years). Their tumors ranged from 0.6 to 25.0 cm in maximum diameter size (median size 2.7 cm in women and 6.7 cm in men).

== Pathology ==
Grossly, CAF tumors appear as well-circumscribed, firm to rubbery, white/tan to grayish masses some of which appear to consist of multiple lobules. Rarely, these tumors had infiltrated into adjacent muscles or other nearby tissues. As determined by microscopic analyses, CAF tumors are composed of bland spindle-shaped cells in an edematous to fibrous stromal background containing bundles of collagen fibers, small to medium-sized, thick-walled, prominently hyalinized (i.e. glassy appearing) blood vessels, and a minor component of adipose tissue (i.e. fat tissue). Numerous mast cells, moderate numbers of lymphocytes, and small numbers of neutrophils are scattered throughout this stroma; this stroma does not contain the multinucleated giant cells or epithelioid cells that are often found in certain other types of mesenchymal tumors. However, CAF lesions may contain scattered, abnormally-shaped cells, lipoblasts (i.e. immature fat cells), and diffuse malignant-appearing sarcoma-like changes but these findings do not alter the prognosis of CAF as being a purely benign tumor.

Immunohistochemical analyses find that the cells in CAF tumors express the CD34 protein in ~50% of cases, a smooth muscle actin protein in occasional cases, MUC1 (also termed EMA) and desmin proteins in a minority of cases, but do not express S100 or cytokeratin proteins. Most cases of CAF in females contain CAF tumor cells which express estrogen and progesterone receptors while limited studies in males reported that 3 of 3 CAF cases contained estrogen receptor-expressing tumor cells while only 1 of 3 cases contained progesterone receptor-expressing tumor cells. Detection of one or more of these protein expression patterns can help differentiate CAF from other types of mesenchymal tumors.

== Chromosome and gene abnormalities ==
Fluorescence in situ hybridization analysis shows that the neoplastic cells in all cases of CAF have a deletion in or around band 14 on the long (or "q") arm of one of their two chromosomes 13. This results in a loss of one of the two RB1 genes (located at band 14.2 on the q arm of this chromosome) as well as one of the two FOXO1 genes (located at band 14.11 on the q arm of this chromosome). Deletion of one of the RB1 genes, it is proposed but not yet demonstrated, may act to promote the development and/or progression of CAF tumors. In any event, loss of this gene in one of the two chromosome 13s is extremely helpful for distinguishing CAF from most other mesenchymal tumor types.

== Diagnosis ==
The diagnosis of CAF generally depends on its typical location in vulva-vaginal and inguinal-scrotal areas, spindle-shaped cell histopathology, tumor cell expressions of marker proteins, and absence of one of the two RP1 genes. CAF can be hard to distinguish from two other spindle-shaped cell tumors, myofibroblastoma and spindle cell lipoma, that commonly also contain tumors cells with deletions in one of their two RF1 genes. The characteristic hyalinized blood vessels and the presence of CD34 protein-expressing and desmin protein-expressing cells in CAF help to distinguish it from myofibroblastoma. Unlike CAF, spindle cell lipomas seldom contain desmin protein-expressing or progesterone receptor-expressing tumor cells and commonly contain CD99- and S100-expressing proteins. In addition, spindle cell lipomas are rare in the vulvovaginal region and their tumor vasculature consists of capillary-sized, thin-walled blood vessels while those of CAF consist of more numerous blood vessels with thick, hyalinized walls. CAR and angiomyofibroblastoma can be difficult to distinguish from one another but angiomyofibroblastoma tumor cells show no alterations in their RB1 and FOXO1 genes.

== Treatment and prognosis ==
The current standard for treating CAF tumors is total surgical resection (i.e. resection that does not leave any residual neoplastic tissue behind). This treatment appears adequate (i.e. curative) even in cases were CAF tumors contain atypical cells and/or sarcoma-like histopathology. In many reported cases, CAF tumors treated with simple surgical excision or "shelling out" also appeared to have achieved adequate results. CAF tumors rarely recur at the sites of their surgical removal whether treated by total or simple resections and have not been reported to metastasize. Consequently, the prognosis for CAF is excellent.
