= Fibroma =

Benign tumors composed of fibrous or connective tissue

- Other names: Fibroid tumors, fibroids
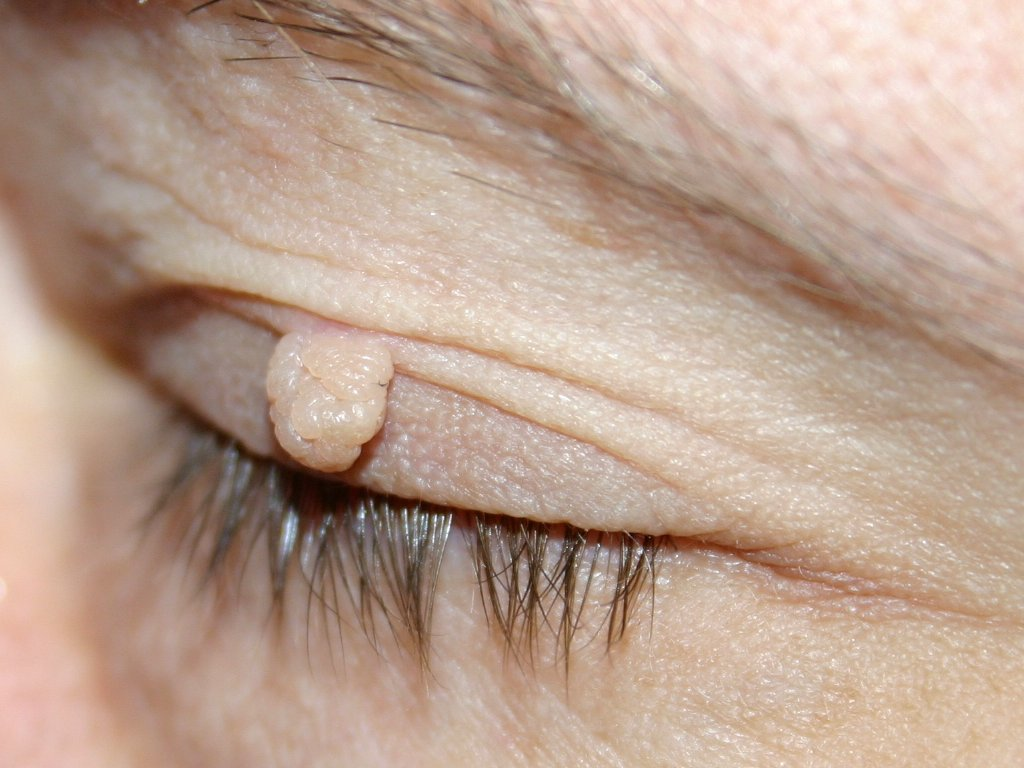
- Soft fibroma (fibroma molle)
- Specialty: Oncology
- Differential diagnosis: Fibrosarcoma
- Treatment: Cryotherapeutic removal, snip removal

Fibromas are benign tumors that are composed of fibrous or connective tissue. They can grow in all organs, arising from mesenchyme tissue. The term "fibroblastic" or "fibromatous" is used to describe tumors of the fibrous connective tissue. When the term fibroma is used without modifier, it is usually considered benign, with the term fibrosarcoma reserved for malignant tumors.

== Types ==
=== Hard fibroma ===
The hard fibroma (fibroma durum) consists of many fibres and few cells, e.g. in skin it is called dermatofibroma (fibroma simplex or nodulus cutaneous). A special form is the keloid, which derives from hyperplastic growth of scars.

=== Soft fibroma ===
The soft fibroma (fibroma molle) or fibroma with a shaft (acrochordon, skin tag, fibroma pendulans) consist of many loosely connected cells and less fibroid tissue. It mostly appears at the neck, armpits or groin. The photo shows a soft fibroma of the eyelid.

=== Other types of fibroma ===
The fibroma cavernosum or angiofibroma, consists of many often dilated vessels, it is a vasoactive tumor occurring almost exclusively in adolescent males.

The cystic fibroma (fibroma cysticum) has central softening or dilated lymphatic vessels.

The myxofibroma (fibroma myxomatodes) is produced by liquefaction of the underlying soft tissue.

The cemento-ossifying fibroma is hard and fibrous, most frequently seen in the jaw or mouth, sometimes in connection with a fracture or another type of injury.

Other fibromas: chondromyxoid fibroma, desmoplasmic fibroma, nonossifying fibroma, ossifying fibroma, nuchal fibroma, collagenous fibroma, fibroma of tendon sheath, perifollicular fibroma, pleomorphic fibroma, uterine fibroma, Gardner fibroma, etc.

The neurofibroma is a benign nerve-sheath tumor in the peripheral nervous system.

=== Ovarian fibroma ===
It appears in the sex cord-stromal tumour group of ovarian neoplasms. Ovary fibromas are most frequent during middle age, and rare in children. Upon gross pathological inspection, ovary fibromas are firm and white or tan. Variants with edema are especially likely to be associated with Meigs' syndrome. On microscopic examination, there are intersecting bundles of spindle cells producing collagen.

There may be thecomatous areas (fibrothecoma). The presence of an ovarian fibroma can cause ovarian torsion in some cases.

== Treatment ==
Benign fibromas may, but need not, be removed. Removal is usually a brief outpatient procedure or using cryotherapy in which the lesion is deep frozen (-196 degrees Celsius using liquid nitrogen) and thawed for two or more cycles, with full recovery within 3 to 4 weeks. The cryotherapy treatment needs no anesthetics and is painless. Another simple treatment is snip removal after injecting local anesthetic.

== See also ==
- Acrochordon (skin tags)
- Fibrous lesions
