= Mammary myofibroblastoma =

- Other names: Mammary and extramammary myofibroblastoma
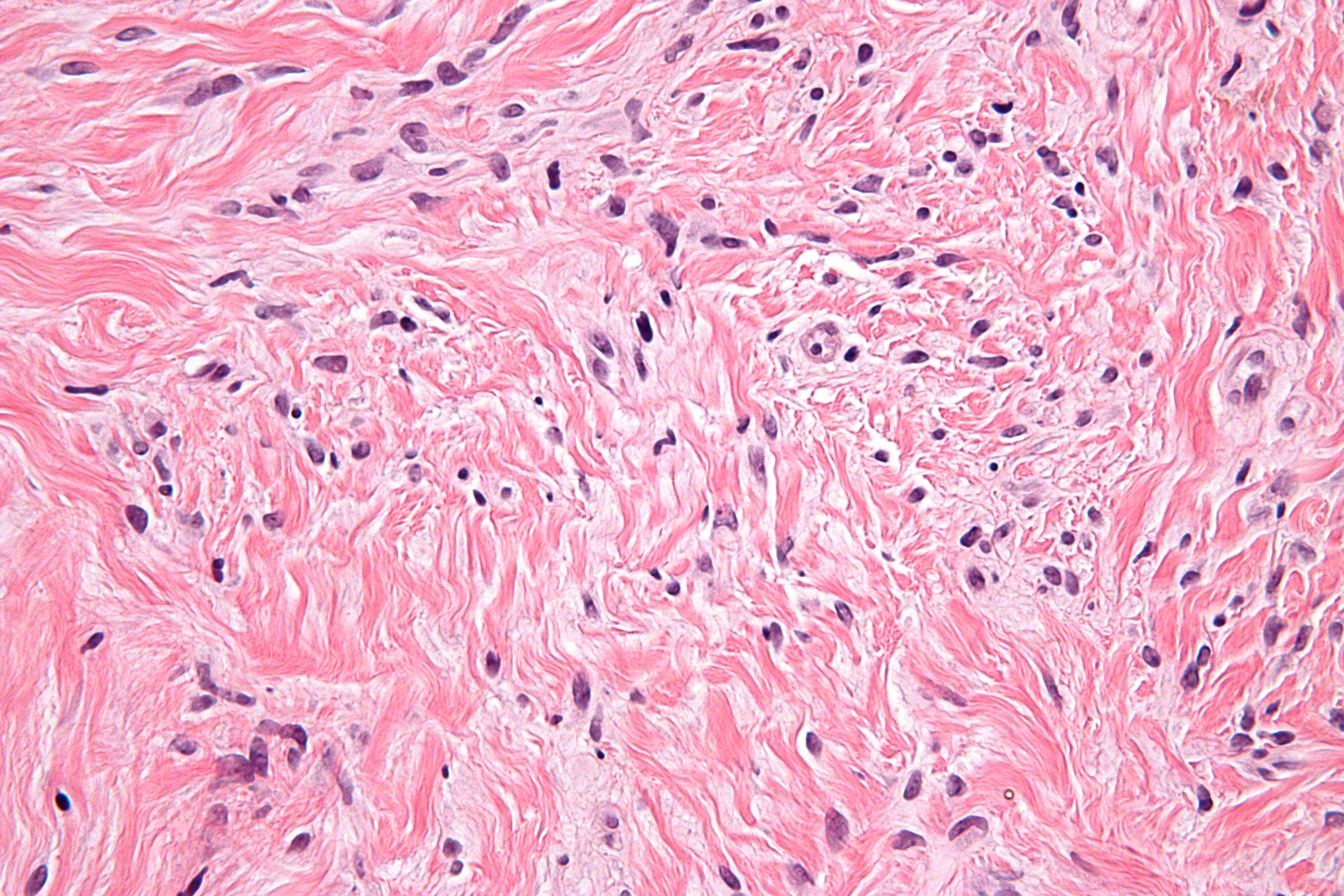
- Micrograph of mammary myofibroblastoma. H&E stain.
- Specialty: Oncology, Pathology

Mammary myofibroblastoma (MFB), also named mammary and extramammary myofibroblastoma, was first termed myofibroblastoma of the breast, or, more simply, either mammary myofibroblastoma or just myofibroblastoma. The change in this terminology occurred because the initial 1987 study and many subsequent studies found this tumor only in breast tissue. However, a 2001 study followed by numerous reports found tumors with the microscopic histopathology and other key features of mammary MFB in a wide range of organs and tissues. Further complicating the issue, early studies on MFB classified it as one of various types of spindle cell tumors that, except for MFB, were ill-defined. These other tumors, which have often been named interchangeably in different reports, are: myelofibroblastoma, benign spindle cell tumor, fibroma, spindle cell lipoma, myogenic stromal tumor, and solitary stromal tumor. Finally, studies suggest that spindle cell lipoma and cellular angiofibroma are variants of MFB. Here, the latter two tumors are tentatively classified as MFB variants but otherwise MFB is described as it is more strictly defined in most recent publications. The World Health Organization in 2020 classified mammary myofibroblastoma tumors and myofibroblastoma tumors (i.e. extramammary myofibroblastic tumors) as separate tumor forms within the category of fibroblastic and myofibroblastic tumors.

Mammary MFB likely represents less than 1% of all breast tumors. Extramammary MFB, however, has in recent studies been found to occur far more frequently than mammary MFB: a study of 143 patients reported that extramammary MFB outnumbered mammary MFB 10 to 1. Hence, the overall disease may be more common than previously considered. Extramammary MFB occurs about equally in males and females of both sexes and has a broad age distribution that includes children. Mammary MFB likewise occurs about equally in both sexes but has a decided predominance in middle-aged and older adults.

MFB are completely benign tumors, i.e. they do not metastasize and when surgically removed rarely recur. Microscopically, they consist of neoplastic spindle cells, i.e. cells that are longer than wide, have a morphology somewhere between fibroblasts and myofibroblasts, have similarly appearing counterparts in normal tissues, and in normal tissues are usually identified as fibroblasts. The neoplastic cells commonly: 1) have acquired a gene chromosome abnormality in which a small part of chromosome 13 is deleted; 2) fail to express the retinoblastoma protein (pRb) due to this deletion; and 3) contain key tumor marker proteins. A tumor with this characteristic microscopic appearance, 13q14 deletion, loss of pRb, and presence of marker proteins strongly indicate that it is a MFB and, importantly, distinguishes it from other more aggressive tumors that it may otherwise resemble and be diagnosed as.

== Signs and symptoms ==
MFB of the breast is a mass that in women may be first detected on routine breast self-examination or other screening methods such as mammography. Men with breast MFB generally present with a palpable breast mass. While diagnosed in individuals 25 to 87 years old, mammary MFB is most common in post-menopausal women and older (60–70 years) men. It has been associated with taking estrogens and, in men, gynecomastia. MFB often develops in tissues derived from embryonic milk lines, i.e. two lines of embryonic tissues that give rise to post-embryonic tissues that extend from the mid-axillae to the medial groins. Milk line MLB tumors occur in areas around the arm pit, anus, vulva, and testicles. While MFB tumors in these sites do not have breast tissue they, like normal breast tissue, have fibroblastic and/or myofibroblastic cells that may be predisposed to form MFB tumors. Milk-line tumors located outside of the immediate breast areas and lymph nodes draining these areas (including axillary lymph nodes) are here regarded as extramammary MFB. Breast MFB has also been reported to develop at a surgical scar left after treatment for breast cancer and in patients with a history of prostate, kidney, and pancreatic cancer. This tumor typically presents as a single, firm, mobile, painless mass; presentation as multiple masses is extremely rare. It lacks a capsule and generally is smaller than 4 cm although some have been recorded to be as large as 35.2 cm.

In a study of 128 patients with extramammary MFB tumors (average size 6.6 cm, range 1–22 cm), 65 occurred in the inguinal/groin region, 18 in the leg, 17 in the trunk, 14 in the abdominal cavity, retroperitoneal space, or organs in these areas, 7 in the chest, 3 in the head-neck areas, 2 in the vagina, and 2 in the arm. Most patients (average age 56 years, range 4–96 years) had no symptoms or complained of a painless swelling developing over the previous few days although some had been aware of the mass for years. Only a minority (~20%) of individuals with extramammary MFB complain of a painful mass.

The tentatively classified spindle cell variant of extramammary MFB typically presents as a well-defined heterogeneous subcutaneous mass in men (10:1 male-to-female ratio) aged 45–70 years (mean age 54 years) with a predilection for arising in the shoulder, posterior neck, and upper back. However, a recent retrospective review of 27 patients with this disease found that it occurred mostly in men (2:1 male-to-female ratio), 18 to 80 years old (average age 56.5 years), ranged from 2 to 10 cm in size, and was located most commonly either in the flank/paraspinal (24% of cases), neck (20%), shoulder (16%), foot/ankle (12%), or other (28%) areas. The tentatively classified cellular angiofibroma variant of MFB typically occurs in adults (women 40–50 years old, men 60–70 years old with rare cases in children), is usually a small tumor but can be as large as 25 cm, and frequently develops in the groin-scrotum or vulva-vaginal regions.

== Diagnosis ==
Medical imaging may suggest but cannot prove that a tumor is MFB. Mammography, computed tomography scans, and magnetic resonance imaging of mammary and extramammary MFB typically show well-defined and well-circumscribed tumors which in almost all cases have no calcifications; these results suggest that the tumor is not malignant but do not indicate which type it might be. The diagnosis of MFB depends on the microscopic histopathology (i.e. appearances after proper tissue preparation and staining) of its pre-surgery biopsied issues. As shown in the upper image and the two images in the Additional images section seen below, both mammary and extramammary MFB tissues contain spindle cells, variable numbers of adipocytes (i.e. fat cells) and broad sheets or, less often, thick bundles of collagen fibers. About 4% of cases have an epithelial tumor cell-like morphology, i.e. the tissues are composed predominantly of epithelioid cells variably mixed with a minority (10% to 40%) of round, polygonal, and spindle-shaped cells. Unlike malignant tumors, MFB tumors do not have: a) atypical cells except in the rare cases which contain small clumps of multinucleated cells; b) rapidly proliferating cells as defined by measuring the proliferative index (i.e. fraction of cells undergoing mitosis); or c) areas of necrosis (i.e. areas of dead or dying cells). Microscopy of tumors in the spindle cell lipoma tentative variant of MFB show a mixture of mature fat cells, ropey collagen, and spindle cells in a myxoid (i.e. background connective tissue that stains blue or purple rather than the red of normal connective tissue) matrix. The blood vessels in these tumors often appear hyalinized. Tumor tissues in the tentative cellular angiofibroma variant of MFB contain spindle cells in all cases, fat cells in ~50% of cases, mast cells, peri-vascular infiltrates of lymphocytes, pleomorphic cells in some cases, and cells with some features of the malignant sarcoma cells in sarcoma tumors in rare cases. (The presence of these sarcoma-like cells does not seem to impact the prognosis of this variant.) All of these cells are in edematous-to-fibrous stromatous tissue.

The neoplastic cells in mammary and extramammary MFB have a small deletion in the long (i.e. "q") arm at site 14 in one of their two chromosome 13s (deletion notated as 13q14). This leads to a loss in expression of pRb, a protein made by the Rb gene located at the deletion site. The presence of pRb is commonly determined by immunohistochemical detection of it in the nucleus of the neoplastic cells; this method finds no pRb in up to 92% of all MFB cases. The presence of two marker proteins in MFP neoplastic cells, also detected by immunohistochemical analyses, support the diagnosis of MFB. These proteins are CD34, a cell surface glycoprotein present in up to 89% of MFB cases, and desmin, a protein located within cells present in up to 91% of MFB cases.

Neoplastic cells in the spindle cell lipoma tentative MFB variant, similar to mammary and non-mammary MFB, express CD34 and desmin and, in 70% of cases, have the 13q14 defect and therefore do not express pRb. The cellular angiofibroma tentative variant's neoplastic cells also lack pRb in most cases and express CD34 but express desmin in only a small percentage of cases. Neoplastic cells in mammary and extramammary MMB commonly express the estrogen, progesterone and androgen receptors. Incomplete studies on the cellular angiofibroma tentative variant find the presence of estrogen and progesterone receptors on the neoplastic cells in at least some cases while studies in the spindle cell lipoma variant's neoplastic cells find only a minority (<20%) of cases have estrogen receptor-positive neoplastic cells. Progesterone receptor-positive neoplastic cells occur in only rare cases of this variant.

=== Differential diagnosis ===
MFB can resemble and should be distinguished from several types of tumors most of which carry a more serious prognosis than MFB.

Well-differentiated liposarcoma (WDL), also termed atypical lipomatous tumor (ATL) or ATL/WDL, is an extremely rare tumor which unlike MFB is composed of mature, morphologically homogenous fat and stromal cells that frequently have atypical nuclei. This tumor characteristically has neoplastic cells with an extra, abnormally-shaped small supernumerary marker chromosome(s). These chromosomes consist of a small number of genes copied from the q arm of chromosome 12 at sites 13–15 (notated 12q13–q15) containing and thereby amplifying expression of the CDK4 and MDM2 genes and these genes CD4K glycoprotein and MDM2 protein products. ATL/WDL neoplastic cells generally express pRB. WDL is differentiated from MFB by its histology and detecting these abnormal chromosomes.

Desmoid fibromatosis, also termed desmoid-type fibromatosis, is a slow growing, rarely multifocal tumor that does not metastasize but is locally aggressive. About 10% of cases develop in individuals with the inherited disease, familial adenomatous polyposis (FAP). FAP is due to inherited mutations in the APC gene responsible for making adenomatous polyposis coli (APC) protein. The remaining 90% of cases with this tumor have mutations in the CTNNB1 gene responsible for making beta-catenin protein. The two mutations cause respective losses in APC protein or excessive accumulations of APC protein. Dermatoid fibromatosis tumors consist of uniform myofibroblasts in a background of abundant collagenous stroma and vascular tissue. The disease differs from MFB in its histopathology, absence of APC protein, excessive beta-catenin protein, and absence of desmin protein.

Solitary fibrous tumor (SFT) is a rarely metastasizing but locally aggressive tumor. It originates in the lung plerua or, rarely, abdominal cavity and a wide range of other areas. SFT consists of CD34-positive mesenchymal spindle cells in a highly fibrous and vascular matrix. Rarely, this tumor contains fat cells and thereby can be confused with MFB. It is distinguished from MFB by containing tumor cells which overexpress STAT6 protein as determined by immunohistochemical analysis. The expressed STAT6 in SFT is actually a fusion protein formed by a mutation in which part of the NAB2 gene fuses with the STAT6 gene to produce a (NAB2)-STAT6 chimeric gene whose fusion protein product is detected by specific immunohistochemistry assays for STAT6 protein.

Fibromas can have the same prognoses and morphological as well as 13q14-deleted/pRB-negative neoblastic cells as MFB but differ from MFB in that their neoplastic cells do not express desmin. These fibromas are benign and could justifiably be categorizes as MFB variants.

Pseudoangiomatous stromal hyperplasia (also termed pseudoangiomatous stromal proliferation) is a benign breast tumor that occurs most frequently in pre-menopausal women and men with gynecomastia. It consists of interconnecting, angulated, slit-like spaces lined by slender spindle cells and surrounded by dense collagenous stroma. This morphology and absence of the 13q14-deletion, presence of pRB-negative, and in most cases absence of desmin in this tumor's neoplastic cells distinguish it from MFB.

== Treatment ==
Biopsy and analyses of at least a few MFB markers (e.g. pRB, 13q14, CD24, desmim, and estrogen, progesterone, androgen receptors) can strongly indicate the diagnosis of MFB and its variants. Pre-surgical biopsy of the suspect lesion is strongly recommended because surgical treatment of MFB can be less aggressive than the treatments needed for many other tumors. The recommended treatment of MFB and its variants is conservative surgical removal. If indicated by the tumors location, the surgery can leave some neoplastic cells behind: MTF almost never recurs even when not all tumor tissue is removed. Routine post-surgical follow-up should be included in the treatment regimen for MFB.

== Additional images ==
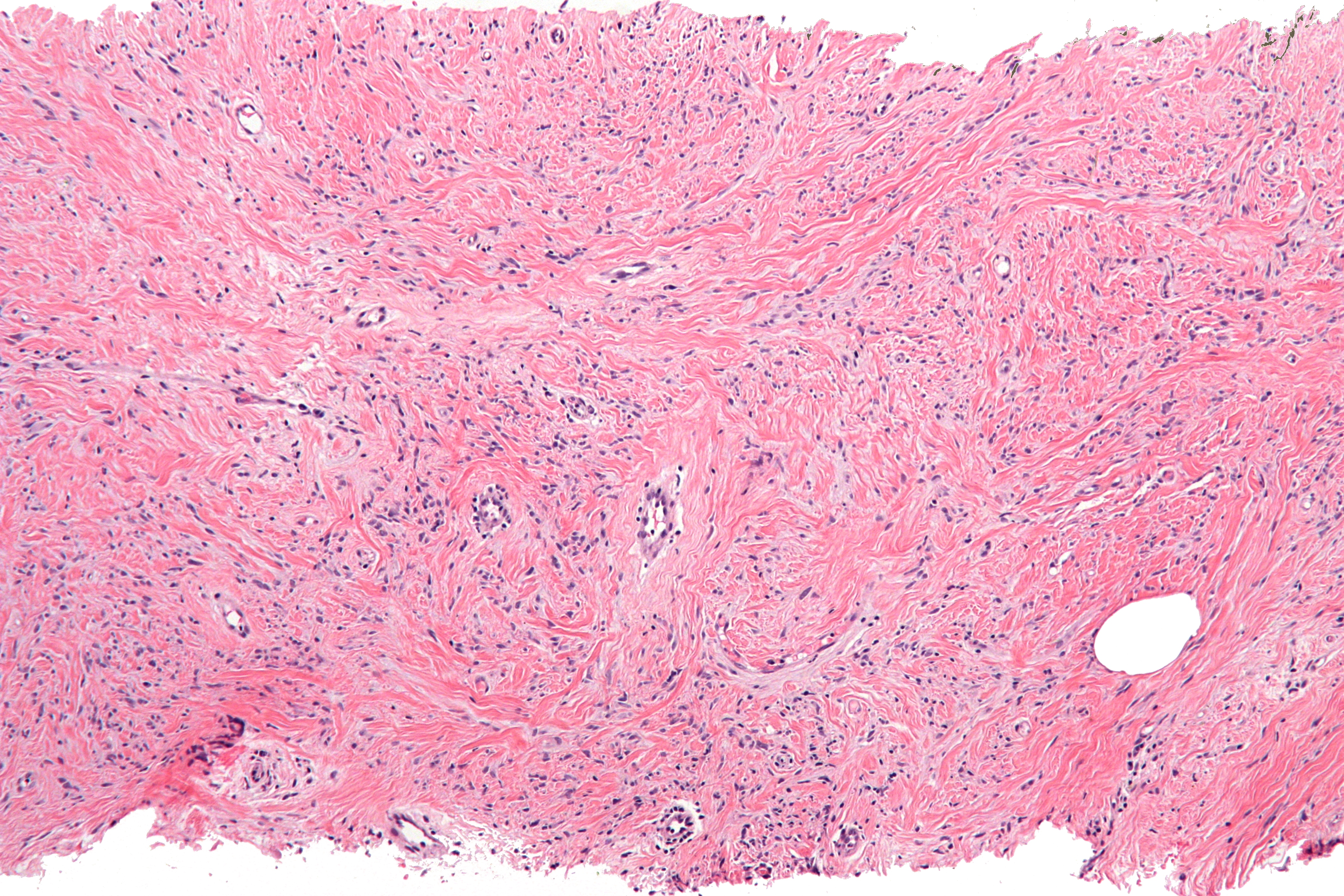
Intermed. mag.

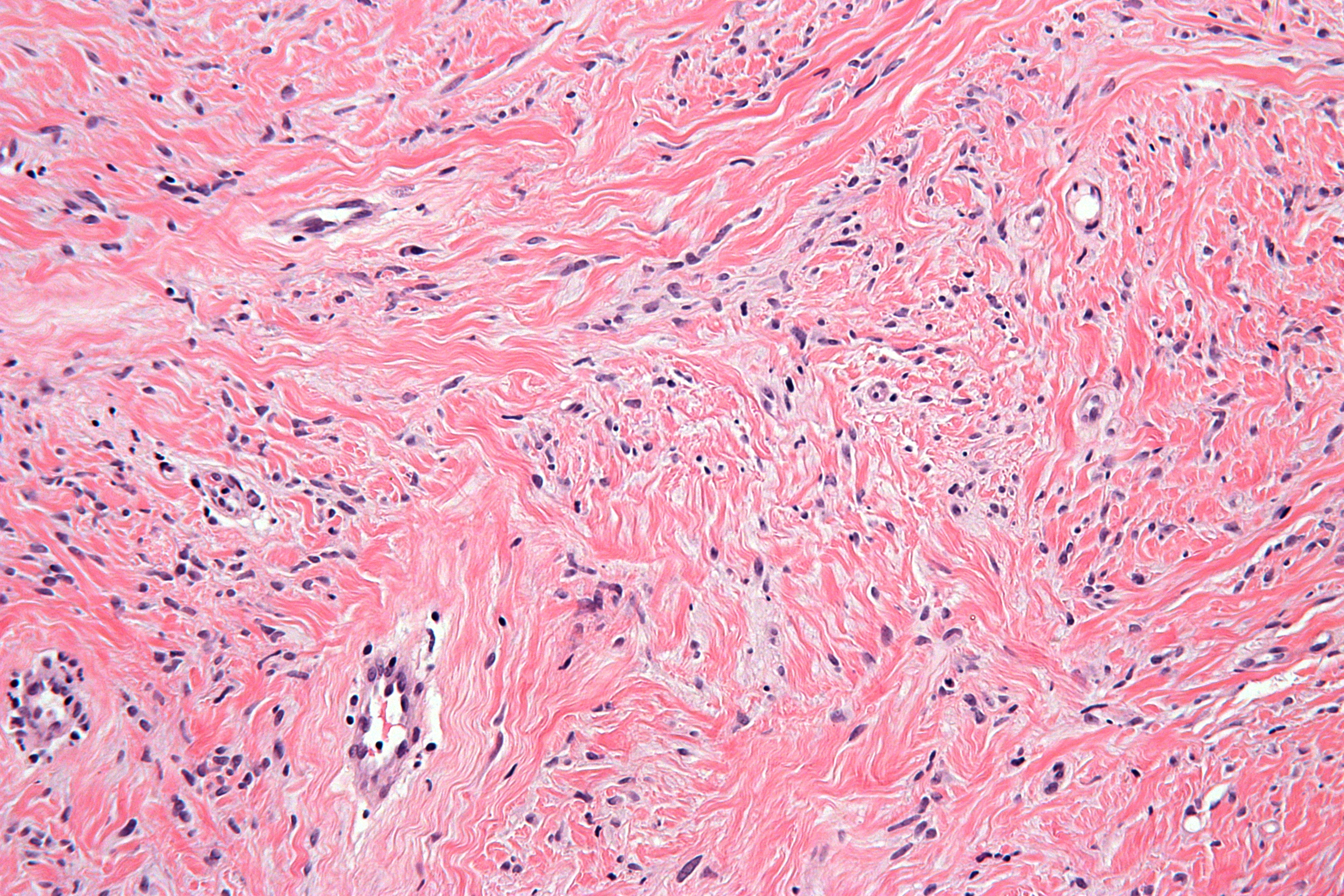
High mag.

== See also ==
- Spindle cell lipoma
- Breast cancer classification
