= Fibroblastic and myofibroblastic tumors =

Tumors originating from fibroblast or muscle cell precursors

- Specialty: Pathology, Dermatology, General surgery, Oncology, Surgical oncology
- Types: Benign, locally invasive, rarely metastasizing, malignant

Fibroblastic and myofibroblastic tumors (FMTs) are tumors which develop from the mesenchymal stem cells which differentiate into fibroblasts (the most common cell type in connective tissue) and/or the myocytes/myoblasts that differentiate into muscle cells. FMTs are a heterogeneous group of soft tissue neoplasms (i.e. abnormal and excessive tissue growths). The World Health Organization (2020) defined tumors as being FMTs based on their morphology and, more importantly, newly discovered abnormalities in the expression levels of key gene products made by these tumors' neoplastic cells. Histopathologically, FMTs consist of neoplastic connective tissue cells which have differented into cells that have microscopic appearances resembling fibroblasts and/or myofibroblasts. The fibroblastic cells are characterized as spindle-shaped cells with inconspicuous nucleoli that express vimentin, an intracellular protein typically found in mesenchymal cells, and CD34, a cell surface membrane glycoprotein. Myofibroblastic cells are plumper with more abundant cytoplasm and more prominent nucleoli; they express smooth muscle marker proteins such as smooth muscle actins, desmin, and caldesmon. The World Health Organization further classified FMTs into four tumor forms based on their varying levels of aggressiveness: benign, intermediate (locally aggressive), intermediate (rarely metastasizing), and malignant.

Benign FMTs

- Nodular fasciitis
- Proliferative fasciitis and proliferative myositis, originally considered separate entities, are now considered to differ only in the tissues involved.
- Myositis ossificans and fibro-osseous pseudotumor of digits, previously considered separate but similar tumors, are reclassified as being virtually identical neoplastic bone-forming tumors.
- Ischaemic fasciitis, previously termed atypical decubital fibroplasia or decubital ischemic fasciitis, was thought to be a non-neoplastic lesion and to occur only in the deep subcutaneous tissue at pressure points or bone prominences but more recently has been found to be a benign neoplasm that can occur in a wider range of tissue sites.
- Elastofibroma, also termed elastofibroma dorsi, were originally considered separate tumors with bone-forming capacity but are now considered as belonging to the same neoplastic spectrum
- Fibrous hamartoma of infancy
- Fibromatosis colli, also termed sternomastoid tumor of infancy, sternocleidomastoid pseudotumors, and congenital torticollis
- Juvenile hyaline fibromatosis, also termed fibromatosis hyalinica multiplex juvenilis and the Murray–Puretic–Drescher syndrome, an autosomal recessive inherited genetic disease.
- Infantile digital fibromatosis, also termed inclusion body fibromatosis or Reye tumor
- Fibroma of tendon sheath
- Desmoplastic fibroblastoma, also termed collagenous fibroma.
- Mammary-type myofibroblastoma
- Myofibrobastoma, also termed myofibroblastoma of soft tissues, is a mammary-type myofibroblastoma that occurs in non-mammary tissues and may be as much as 10-fold more common than the mammary type.
- Calcifying aponeurotic fibroma, also termed aponeurotic fibroma
- EWSR1-SMAD3-positive fibroblastic tumor, also termed EWSR1-SMAD3-rearranged fibroblastic tumor, is classified as an emerging (i.e. recently characterized) entity by the World Health Organization, 2020. It is a benign, small tumor located in the skin of the distal areas of the legs and, less commonly, the arm; it has occurred mostly in females. EWSR1-SMAD3-positive fibroblastic tumor was named based on the finding that its tumor cells express a EWSR1-SMAD3 fusion gene. Since its initial description in 2018, a total of 15 cases have been reported as of 2021.
- Angiomyofibroblastoma
- Cellular angiofibroma, an angiofibroma that is a benign, usually small, slow-growing tumor arising in the groin, scrotal or vulva regions.
- Angiofibroma of soft tissue, also termed angiofibroma NOS (NOS indicates Not Otherwise Specified), an angiofibroma that develops in the extremities, particularly around or in the large joints.
- Nuchal fibroma
- Superficial acral fibromyxoma, also termed acral fibromyxoma.
- Gardner fibroma, a benign proliferation of thick, irregularly arranged collagen bundles with interspersed fibroblasts often association with the genetic disease of familial adenomatous polyposis and its variant, the Gardner's syndrome.

Intermediate (locally aggressive) FMTs

- Palmer/plantar-type fibromatosis, also known as plantar fibroma and Ledderhose disease.
- Desmoid-type fibromatosis, also termed desmoid tumor and aggressive fibromatosis
- Lipofibromatosis, a mixture of lipofibromatosis tumors with different gene abnormalities; these tumors differ from lipofibromatosis-like neural tumors which have not been classified as fibroblastic and myofibroblastic tumors.
- Giant cell fibroblastoma
- Dermatofibrosarcoma protuberans
- Fibrous hamartoma of infancy

Intermediate (rarely metastasizing) FMTs

- Dermatofibrosarcoma protuberans, fibrosarcomatous, also termed fibrosarcomatous dermatofibrosarcoma protuberans (or fibrosarcomatous DFSP), is a more aggressive tumor than dermatofibrosarcoma protuberans tumors).
- Solitary fibrous tumour, also fibrous termed tumor of the pleura.
- Inflammatory myofibroblastic tumour
- Low-grade myofibroblastic sarcoma
- Superficial CD34-positive fibroblastic tumour
- Myxoinflammatory fibroblastic sarcoma, also termed acral myxoinflammatory fibroblastic sarcoma because it was initially thought to be limited to acral (i.e. leg and arm) areas.
- Infantile fibrosarcoma, also termed congenital infantile fibrosarcoma and fibrosarcoma, infantile type.

Malignant FMTs

- Solitary fibrous tumor, malignant type, a malignant form of the solitary fibrous tumors
- Fibrosarcoma NOS, i.e. fibrosarcoma, not otherwise specified, or, alternatively, adult fibrosarcoma to distinguish it from rarely metastasizing infantile fibrosarcoma.
- Myxofibrosarcoma, once classified as a histiocyte-derived histiocytoma now reclassified as a fibroblastic/myofibroblastic tumor.
- Low-grade fibromyxoid sarcoma
- Sclerosing epithelioid fibrosarcoma

== See also ==
Plexiform angiomyxoid myofibroblastic tumor
