= Giant-cell fibroblastoma =

Giant cell fibroblastoma
- Specialty: Pediatrics, Dermatology, Pathology
- Symptoms: Painless mass in the dermis
- Usual onset: Pediatric population
- Causes: Thought to be the formation of a COL1A1-PDGFB fusion gene
- Treatment: Surgical excision
- Prognosis: Good
- Frequency: Rare

Giant cell fibroblastoma (GCF) is a rare type of soft-tissue tumor marked by painless nodules in the dermis (the inner layer of the two main layers of tissue that make up the skin) and subcutaneous (beneath the skin) tissue. These tumors may come back after surgery, but they do not spread to other parts of the body. They occur mostly in boys. GCF tumor tissues consist of bland spindle-shaped or stellate-shaped cells interspersed among multinucleated giant cells.

GCF tumors are closely related to dermatofibrosarcoma protuberans (DFSP) and dermatofibrosarcoma protuberans, fibrosarcomatous (DFSP-FS) (also termed fibrosarcomatous dermatofibrosarcoma protuberans) tumors. The World Health Organization (2020) classified these three tumors as different tumors in the category of fibroblastic and myofibroblastic tumors with GCF and DFSP sub-classified as benign but aggressive tumors and DFSP-FS subclassified as a rarely metastasizing tumor. However, The three tumor types may contain areas that have a microscopic histopathological appearance similar to one of the other types. Furthermore, following their surgical resection GCF tumors may recur as DFSP tumors and vice versa and DFSP tumors may recur as DFSP-FS tumors. CGF, DFSP, and DFSP-FS have been regarded as an increasingly aggressive spectrum of related tumors.

Giant cell fibroblastoma tumors are typically treated by surgical resection but have a very high rate of recurrence at the sites of their resection, particularly in cases where all of the tumor has not been removed. Accordingly, wide, complete tumor resections are the recommended treatment for them.

== Presentation ==
As found in one study of 86 individuals, GCF commonly present as single tumors in children less than 10 years old (62% of cases), 10-40 year old individuals (26% of cases), and adults greater that 40 years (12% of cases) (overall median age: 6 years). There is a strong predominance of males in the reported cases of GCF. The tumors are slow-growing, painless, often protuberant, multinodular or polyp-like dermal and subcutaneous tumors masses or plaques (i.e. a lesion that is greater in its diameter than in its depth) that commonly occur on the trunk, upper parts of the arms or legs, or, rarely, the head and neck areas.

== Pathology ==
As defined by microscopic histopathology analyses, GCF tumors consist of a few spindle- and/or stellate-shaped cells in a sclerotic (i.e. collagen fiber-rich) background with distinctive dilated blood vessel-like spaces lined by floret-shaped (i.e. small flower-shaped) multinuclear giant cells. The giant cells vary in size and shape with their nuclei often lined-up in wreath-like or lobular formations. The tumors may infiltrate into and through nearby subcutaneous fat tissue, commonly have intralesional hemorrhages and distinctive perivascular onionskin-like lymphocytes, and occasionally contain nodules of smooth muscle-like cells. Some GCF tumors have hybrid characteristics with areas resembling DFSP (e.g. immature-appearing spindle- and/or stellate-shaped cells with abnormally dark nuclei arranged in a monotonous cartwheel or whorled pattern). These hybrid lesions typical have pure GCF-like areas, pure DFSP-like areas, and mixed areas with a gradual or abrupt transition from one to the other. Surgically removed GCF may recur as a DFSP (and vice versa). (DFSP-FS tumors consist of rapidly growing bundles of spindle- and/or stellate-shaped cells with vesicle-containing, abnormally shaped nuclei.)

Immunohistochemistry analyses indicate that the tumor cells in GCF express CD34 and vimentin proteins but not epithelial membrane antigen (also termed MUC1), ACTA2 (also termed α-SMA), desmin, HMB-45, keratin, S100, or MLANA (also termed Melan-A) proteins.

== Chromosome and gene abnormalities ==
Cases of GCF consistently contain tumor cells that express a COL1A1-PDGFB fusion gene, i.e. a hybrid gene formed by a chromosomal translocation which mergers two previously independent genes. The COL1A1 gene, which directs production of collagen, type I, alpha 1 protein, is normally located in band 21.33 on the long (or "q") arm of chromosome 17. The PDGFB gene, which directs production of platelet-derived growth factor subunit B (PDGFβ), is normally located in band 13.1 on the q arm of chromosome 22. This translocation is typically balanced, i.e. involving an even exchange of material with no genetic information gained or lost and, ideally, resulting in the formation of a fusion gene which directs production of a fully functional protein. DFSP tumors cells also express a COL1A1-PDGFB fusion gene, but this fusion gene typically results from the formation of small supernumerary ring chromosome, i.e. an extra ring-shaped chromosome that contains a merger between the COL1A1 and PDGFB genes. Hybrid GCF-DFSP tumors typically have more copies of the COL1A1-PDGFB fusion gene in DFSP areas compared to GCF areas and GCF tumors progressing to hybrid GCF-DFSP, GCF progressing to DFSP, and DFSP progressing to DFSP-FS tumors tend to show step-wise increases in the total numbers of these fusion genes that they express.

Either form of the COL1A1-PDGFB fusion gene leads to the overexpression of fully active PDGFβ proteins and thereby the continuous activation of their target, the PDGF receptor β, along with this receptor's protein-tyrosine kinase activity. The continuously active protein-tyrosine kinase stimulates mitogen-activated protein kinase, PI3K/AKT/mTOR, and other cell signaling pathways which promote the growth, proliferation, and abnormally prolonged survival of their parent cells. It is suggested that these events underlie the development and progression of GCF, GCF-DFSP, DFSP, and DFSP-FS tumors.

== Diagnosis ==
The diagnosis of GCF depends on its presentation as a dermal tumor that has a characteristic histology consisting of spindle- and/or stellate-shaped CD34 protein-expressing cells, distinctive dilated blood vessel-like spaces lined by floret-shaped multinuclear giant cells, and/or distinctive perivascular onionskin-like lymphocytes and/or intralesional hemorrhages in a collagen fiber-rich background. Presence of tumor cells containing a COL1A1-PDGFB fusion gene, particularly if it is due to a chromosomal translocation rather than an extra supernumerary chromosome, strongly supports the diagnosis of GCF. GSF may have areas with the pathologic and chromosomal findings of DFSP. GCF and these "hybrid" tumors, when surgically resected, often recur and may recur as DFSP tumors.

== Treatment and prognosis ==
Surgical excision with wide surgical margins to ensure the removal of all tumor tissue is the treatment of choice for GCF tumors and their hybrid forms. However, these tumors, particularly in cases that left tumor tissue behind, have had recurrence rates as high as 50% of all cases. The mean time of recurrence after resection was 6.8 years in one large study. Recurrent tumors have been treated by a second surgical excision making sure that all tumor tissue is removed.

Tyrosine kinase inhibitor drugs such as imatinib, sunitinib, and sorafenib have had modest success it treating DFSP tumors located in sites where these tumors are surgical inoperable primary tumors or locally inoperable recurrent tumors or where surgical removal would be disfiguring. Some studies have suggested that these inhibitors might be useful for treating similarly inoperable or disfiguring GCF tumors but no formal studies on the use of tyrosine kinase inhibitors in GCF have been as yet reported.
