= Radial scar =

- Other names: Radial scar of the breast
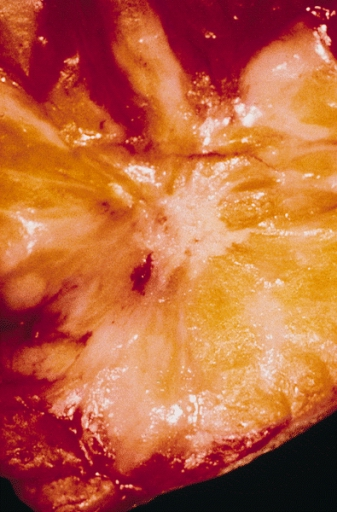
- Gross pathology image of an excised radial scar.
- Specialty: General surgery

A radial scar, formally radial scar of the breast, is a benign breast lesion that can radiologically mimic malignancy, i.e. cancer.

Radial scar is associated with atypia and/or malignancy and may be an independent risk factor for the development of carcinoma in either breast.

== Diagnosis ==
Radial scars are diagnosed by a microscopic examination of excised tissue, i.e. they are diagnosed by pathologists based on their histomorphology.

=== Histomorphology ===
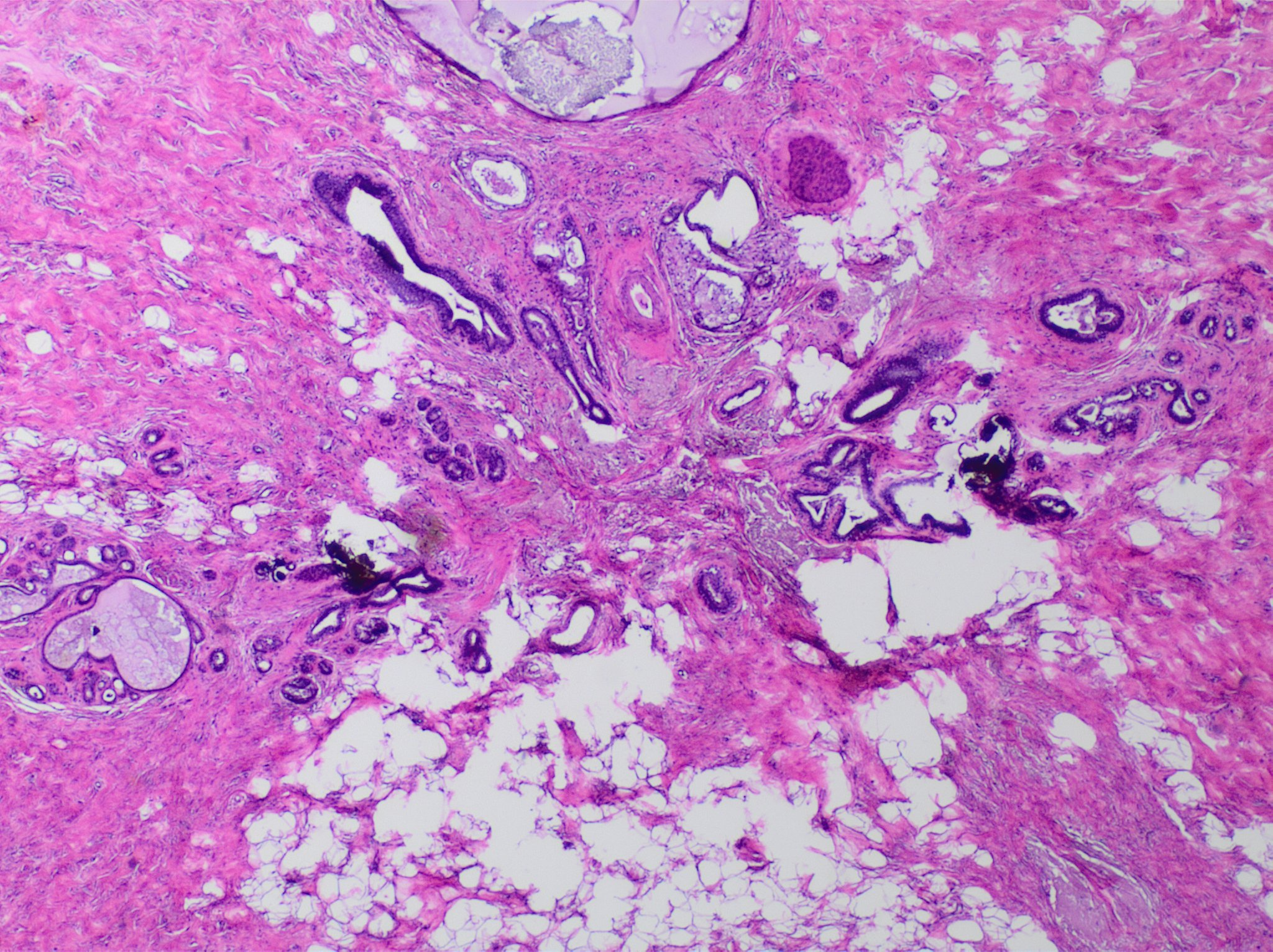
Histopathology of a radial scar of the breast, seen as a fibroelastic stroma and entrapped glands radiating outward. H&E stain.

Radial scars are spiculated masses characterized microscopically by a sclerotic appearing (i.e. scar like) center with peripheral entrapped normal breast ducts and lobules.

== Management ==
The presence of a radial scar on imaging mandates a percutaneous core biopsy for histologic diagnosis. Excisional biopsy is usually recommended for radial scar, although it has been argued that core biopsy evaluation and surveillance may be appropriate in selected patients.

== See also ==
- Breast cancer
