= Macroscopic scale =

Length scale which are visible to the naked eye

In physics, the macroscopic scale is the length scale on which objects or phenomena are large enough to be directly visible with the naked eye, or with the aid of ordinary optical instruments. The opposite or microscopic scale refers to objects at the scale of atoms and molecules. Counterintuitively, this concept of macroscopic includes objects observed under a microscope and differs somewhat from dictionary definitions which include objects visible only under a microscope in the microscopic realm.

In pathology and geology, the macroscopic scale refers to objects visible without a microscope.

== In statistical mechanics ==
In statistical mechanics, a macroscopic quantity refers to averages of many particles, like temperature or pressure. The boundary between microscopic and macroscopic scales is called the thermodynamic limit.

== In quantum mechanics ==
In early quantum mechanics, macroscopic scale distinguished a measurement apparatus from the quantum system being studied. These concepts were not clearly defined and were often conflated with macroscopic meaning a system treatable with classical mechanics while microscopic meant quantum mechanics was required. Numerous attempts to define the boundary between macroscopic and microscopic in quantum mechanics followed, notably work by Anthony Leggett in the 1970s and 1980s. Leggett sought quantum systems of macroscopic scale. Partial success was reported in the measurements of superconducting quantum interference device(SQUID) demonstrating quantum superposition with 10^{9} electrons.

== In pathology ==
In pathology, macroscopic diagnostics generally involves gross pathology, in contrast to microscopic histopathology. The macroscopic examination is critical to select appropriate areas for additional microscopic study.

== In geology ==
In geology, megascopic refers to the study of rocks without the aid of a microscope, typically in the field. Studying rocks under a microscope is valuable training in the classification of rocks and can lead to more successful identification in the field.

== See also ==
- Microscope
