= Collagenous fibroma =

Benign fibrous tumor

- Specialty: Dermatology

Collagenous fibroma, also known as desmoplastic fibroblastoma, is a slow-growing, deep-set, benign fibrous tumor, usually located in the deep subcutis, fascia, aponeurosis, or skeletal muscle of the extremities, limb girdles, or head and neck regions. The World Health Organization in 2020 reclassified desmoplastic fibroblastoma/collagenous fibroma as a specific benign tumor type within the broad category of fibroblastic and myofibroblastic tumors.

== Signs and symptoms ==
Clinically, the lesion is observed as a hard, well-circumscribed, lobulated, round to oval, or fibrous mass that has a sparkling gray-to-white aspect and appears fibrous on the cut surface. Patients with these tumors often appear with a history of a painless, slowly developing mass, often over a reasonably lengthy period of time. These tumors are mostly found in the subcutaneous and skeletal muscle tissues of the extremities. These tumors usually have a diameter of 1 to 20 cm, with a median diameter of 3 cm.

== Diagnosis ==
Collagenous fibroma is characterized histopathologically by long, sweeping fascicles of uniformly spindled cells that range in size from moderately to hypercellular. Long, thick-walled arteries exhibiting perivascular stromal edema are seen. Gardner fibroma, nuchal-type fibroma, and desmoid tumor are examples of differential diagnoses.

The fibroblastic cells have strong vimentin immunohistochemistry. A small number of cells may exhibit positive immunoreactivity for alpha-smooth muscle actin and muscle-specific proteins. The cells resemble fibroblasts or myofibroblasts in terms of ultrastructure.

== Treatment ==
Patients with collagenous fibroma who undergo marginal excision have good surgical results. Video-assisted surgery has been suggested as a substitute for traditional open surgery in the removal of tumors on the chest wall because it minimizes tissue damage and allows for a smaller incision.

== See also ==
- Skin lesion
