= Cartwheel pattern =

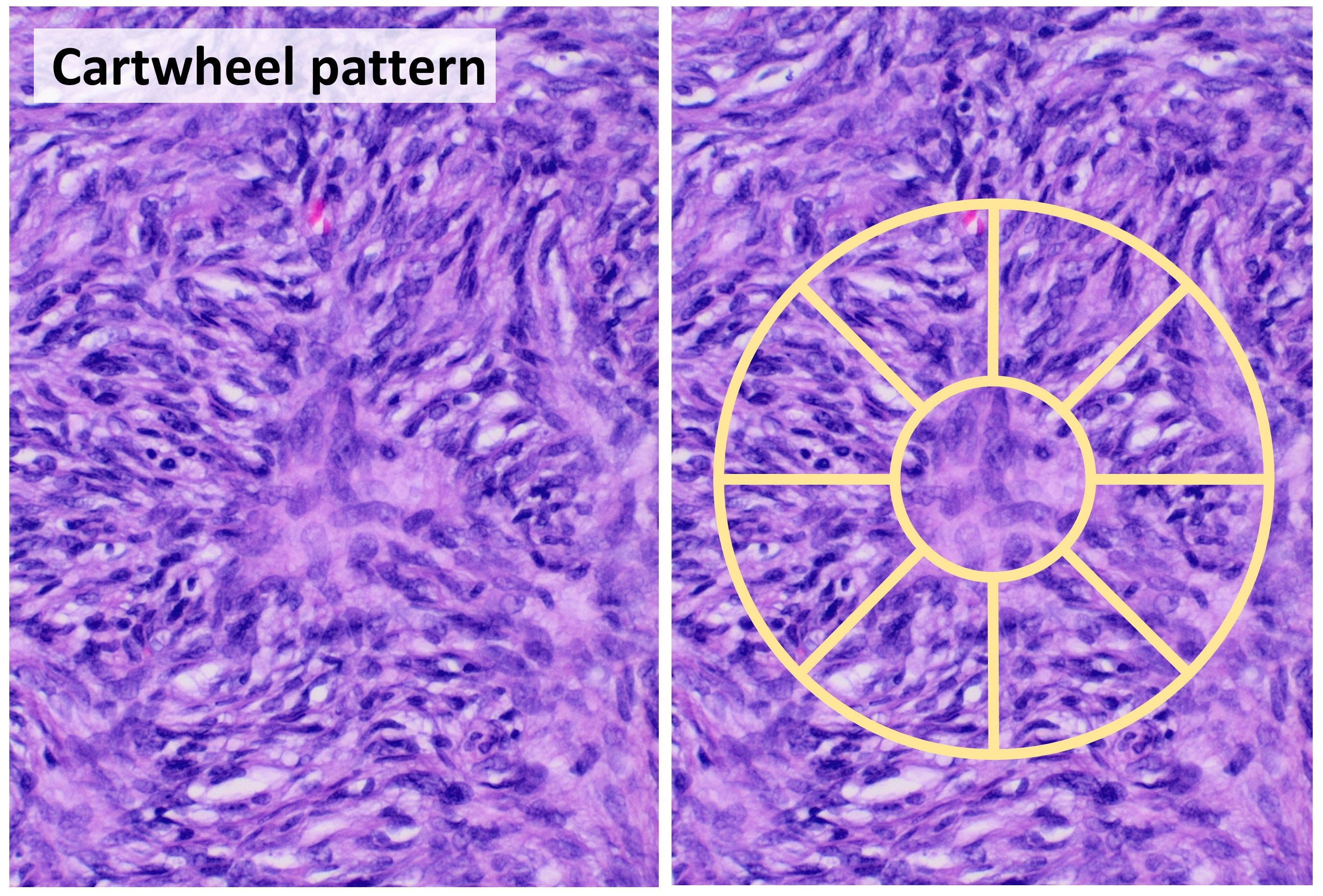
Cartwheel pattern. This is a case of dermatofibrosarcoma protuberans from skin and soft tissue in the abdominal area. HE stain.

A cartwheel pattern is a histopathologic architectural pattern. Microscopically, cartwheel arrangements appear to have center points that radiate cells or connective tissue outward. Cartwheel patterns may be irregular and, at lower magnification, can cause tissue to appear tangled into clumps.

Skin tumors that can be classified as "storiform," having spindle cells with elongated nuclei radiating from a center point, are mainly:

- Fibrous histiocytoma (dermatofibroma)
- Soft tissue perineurioma
- Dermatofibrosarcoma protuberans
