= Fibromatosis colli =

Rare, benign tumor in the neck muscles present at birth

- Other names: Sternocleidomastoid tumor of infancy, Pseudotumor of infancy, infancy sternocleidomastoid pseudotumor
- Specialty: Pediatrics, Pathology
- Symptoms: Mass in the sternocleidomastoid muscle
- Complications: Torticollis
- Usual onset: congenital
- Types: Benign tumor
- Causes: Unknown
- Prognosis: Good

Fibromatosis colli (FMC), also termed sternocleidomastoid tumor of infancy, pseudotumor of infancy, and infancy sternocleidomastoid pseudotumor, is an uncommon (incidence: 0.4%–1.3% of live births), congenital tumor in one of the two sternocleidomastoid neck muscles although rare cases have presented with a FMC tumor in both sternocleidomastoid muscles. A tumor is here defined as a growth of tissue that is not coordinated with the normal surrounding tissue and persists in growing even if the original trigger for its growth is removed. FMC tumors are benign growths that may cause disfigurements but are not cancers and do not metastasize (i.e. spread) to distant tissues.

As judged by microscopic cytology analyses, fibromatosis colli tumors consist of spindle-shaped fibroblasts (i.e. the most common cell type in connective tissue) located in a background of collagen fibers, decomposing skeletal muscle fibers, and, in some cases, regenerating skeletal muscle fibers. The fibroblasts have a completely normal appearance with no evidence suggesting that they are malignant. The World Health Organization in 2020 classified fibromatosis colli in the category of benign fibroblastic and myofibroblastic tumors.

In the majority of cases, FMC tumors decrease in size and completely resolve by the newborn's second year. If left untreated, however, a significant percentage of cases progress to, and are the most frequent cause of, congenital muscular torticollis, i.e. an abnormal, asymmetrical head or neck position commonly called wry neck. Untreated FMC tumors may also progress to facial asymmetry, plagiocephaly (i.e. flattened head), permanent loss of neck mobility, scoliosis (i.e. sidewise curvature of the spine), or other structural disfigurements that result from compensatory mechanisms.

== Presentation ==
FMC tumors most commonly present as slow-growing, firm, mobile, nontender, spindle-shaped masses in the lower two-thirds of the sternocleidomastoid muscle of infants within 8 weeks (average: 24 days) of delivery. At diagnosis, these infants' heads may tilt toward the side with the mass while their chins tilt to the opposite, uninvolved side. This tilting is due to sternocleidomastoid muscle contracture. FMC tumors are more common in males and the right sternocleidomastoid muscle although very rare cases present with bilateral tumors. Untreated, the masses may continue to grow for weeks after birth but then stabilize, start regressing after 4–8 months of life, and over the ensuing 1–2 years typically fully resolve. In three studies, >25%, >50% and >80% of these infants have had difficult deliveries such as a breech birth, delivery requiring forceps, primigravida birth (i.e. mother's first child), prolonged, difficult labor, or delivery by Caesarean section. From 6-20% of newborns with fibromatosis colli also present with other congenital lesions such as hip dysplasia or, less commonly, facial asymmetry.

== Pathology ==
Microscopic histopathological analyses of biopsied FMC tumor tissues typically find benign-appearing, spindle-shaped fibroblasts, decomposing skeletal muscle fibers, and, in some cases, regenerating skeletal muscle fibers in a collagen fiber-containing background. If necessary, these tumors are typically diagnosed by microscopic examination of fine-needle aspiration samples rather than the more invasive approach of tumor biopsy sampling. The aspirates show scant to moderately cellular, scattered, oval-shaped to spindle-shaped fibroblasts, naked nuclei (i.e. cell nuclei virtually devoid of other cell elements such as the cytoplasm), wisps of collagen, atrophic, degenerating muscle fibers, regenerating muscle fibers, and intact skeletal muscle cells containing multiple nuclei. There is no evidence of inflammation, hemorrhage, cell necrosis, or rapidly dividing and/or proliferating cells.

== Etiology ==
It has been postulated that the FMC tumor mass itself is a remnant of a hematoma caused by tissue injury occurring during delivery. However, there are no features of hematomas (e.g. hemosiderin released by dying red blood cells) in theses lesions at diagnosis and no evidence of trauma (e.g. overlying skin changes or discolorations) at birth in infants who later present with FMC tumors. It has also been suggested that venous outflow obstruction occurring in the fetus while in the uterus or during delivery leads to degeneration of sternocleidomastoid muscle fibers and subsequent fibrosis of the damaged areas. Finally, it has been suggested that an injury due to poor fetal head positioning in the uterus produces a compartment syndrome-like pressure-induced injury to the sternocleidomastoid muscle that results in muscle cell death followed by tissue fibrosis and the usual pathology of FMC tumors.

== Diagnosis ==
The recommended first step after clinically detecting a sternocleidomastoid mass in a newborn infant is Doppler ultrasonography combined with duplex ultrasonography. This method commonly reveals diagnostic (up to 100% sensitivity rates) findings of diffuse or focal enlargement of sternocleidomastoid muscle that has no cysts or other ultrasonography-detected abnormalities. If these imaging findings are not diagnostic, magnetic resonance imaging may clarify the diagnosis. If the findings still remain unclear, microscopic examination of fine needle asperates taken from the tumor will, when combined with the imaging findings, the lesion’s natural history, and its clinical presentation, likely confirm the diagnosis of FMC in virtually all cases.

== Treatment and prognosis ==
Prompt diagnosis and treatment of FMS is crucial for avoiding the impairments that may follow long-term mal-positioning of infant's head such as permanent facial asymmetry, flattened head, loss of neck mobility, and scoliosis. About 95% of infants with minimal limitations in their head's mobility show improvements in this mobility after four weeks of an active home stimulation program (i.e. observation, massage, and active and passive stretching), while ~91% of infants with more severe movement limitations show good results after three sessions of targeted physiotherapy over a 3–4 month period. The recommended treatment for infants who show no improvements in mobility after one year of physical therapy or who initially present at >12 months of age is surgical tenotomy (i.e. cutting) of one of the tendons on the involved sternocleidomastoid muscle. Tenotomy may use the open surgical (i.e. cutting of skin) approach or endoscopic (i.e. percutaneous) approach. The overall prognosis of FMS tumors is good using these treatment measures.

Infants presenting with FMS should be examined for the presence of hip dysplasia.

== See also ==
- Skin lesion
