= Gardner fibroma =

- Other names: Gardner-associated fibroma
- Specialty: Pediatrics, Dermatology, Pathology, Surgical oncology
- Symptoms: Typically a painless tumor in the skin
- Usual onset: All ages but mostly in the first decade of life
- Types: May be an isolated disorder or a manifestation of the genetic disease, adenomatous polyposis coli
- Treatment: Surgical resection and follow-up testing for the presence or development of adenomatous polyposis coli
- Frequency: Rare

Gardner fibroma (GF) (also termed Gardner-associated fibroma) is a benign fibroblastic tumor (i.e. a tumor containing fibroblasts, the most common cell type in connective tissue). GF tumors typically develop in the dermis (i.e. layer of skin underneath the epidermis) and adjacent subcutaneous tissue lying just below the dermis. These tumors typically occur on the back, abdomen, and other superficial sites but in rare cases have been diagnoses in internal sites such as the retroperitoneum and around the large blood vessels in the upper thoracic cavity. The World Health Organization, 2020, classified Gardner fibroma as a benign tumor in the category of fibroblastic and myofibroblastic tumors.

In the majority of cases, GF tumors are manifestations of the genetic disease, familial adenomatous polyposis (FAP), or its variant, the Gardner syndrome (GS). (Hereafter, references to FAP will include its GS variant.) Furthermore, some cases of GF tumors, including those which are not associated with FAP, progress to or, after their surgical removal, recur as desmoid tumors (DT). A minority of desmoid tumors, mainly those developing in the abdominal cavity, are also associated with FAP. Cases of Gardner fibroma and desmoid tumors that lack any other evidence of being associated with FAB at the time of diagnosis are often termed sporadic Gardner fibromas and sporadic desmoid tumors. However, some cases of sporadic GF and DT will, over the ensuing months or years, present with other signs of, and be diagnosed as, FAP. In these cases, the initial GF and DT tumors are considered the first sign of FAP and termed sentinel GF and sentinel DT tumors.

There are no large studies that clearly define the best treatment(s) for Gardner fibroma tumors. Common treatment strategies for these tumors include: surgical removal; evaluations of the individuals bearing these tumors as well as their family members for evidence of FAP; genetic counseling; and long-term follow-up studies to detect evidence of FAP and recurrences of resected tumors.

== Presentation ==
GF tumors typically present as a single but in some cases multiple plaques (i.e. papule-like masses that are 10 mm or more in longest diameter) located on the skin of the back or, less commonly, head, neck, extremities, or abdominal regions. In one study, the tumors ranged form 0.3 to 12 cm in greatest dimension (mean: 3.9 cm). GF plaques on the skin are generally white, rubbery, painless masses that occur mainly in children during the first decade of life but have also been diagnosed in adults as old as 59 years. Rare cases of CF have presented as large masses located in the: mediastinum, i.e. central compartment of the thoracic cavity (a mediastinal GF has caused the life-threatening superior vena cava syndrome); retropharyngeal space, i.e. space behind the pharynx and upper esophagus (a retropharyngeal GF tumor has caused airway obstruction); retroperitoneal space; and mesentery.

The majority of individuals presenting with GF tumors have or will develop FAP due to mutations in the APC gene. This gene encodes (i.e. directs production of) the adenomatous polyposis coli protein (APC protein) but when mutated in FAP encodes an inactive or weakened product. APC protein acts indirectly to degrade β-catenin, a protein which when overexpressed induces various cancers. Partially or totally inactive APC protein in FAP allows the excessive intracellular accumulation of β-catenin and thereby promotes development of the tumors, cancers, and other manifestations of this disease.

FAP is an autosomal dominant genetic disease which in ~70–80% of cases is due to inheritance and in ~20-30% of case is due to a germline mutation (i.e. non-familial FAP caused by an APC gene mutation that occurs in the germ cells that develop into an individual). Hence, individuals with FAP commonly but not always have family members with the disease. The central feature of FAP is the formation over time of an increasing number of adenomatous polyps (i.e. abnormal growths of tissue projecting from a mucous membrane that have a high potential to become cancerous) in the colon and rectum. Typically, these polyps arise by adolescence and progress to cancer in the colon and/or rectum by age 40 in hereditary or younger ages in non-hereditary FAP. Without intervention, one or more of these polyps become cancerous in 100% of FAP cases. Since this cancerous transformation is extremely rare in individuals <20 years old, prophylactic colectomy for FAP is recommended in patients during their late teen years unless other indications (e.g. regular colonoscopy examinations find increasing numbers of polyps, multiple polyps >1 cm, and/or the appearance of polyps with atypical or cancer-like cells) indicate the need for earlier colectomy. Individuals with FAP also bear the risks of developing a wide range of the disease's other disorders such as: stomach and duodenum polyps; nasopharyngeal angiofibromas; hepatoblastomas; brain, pancreas, and biliary tract tumors; and various skin lesions including Gardner fibromas and desmoid tumors. Individuals with FAP should be surveilled regularly for these disorders and, when found, be appropriately treated for them. Patients presenting with GF tumors may have a family history and/or evidence of one or more other manifestations of FAP. However, individuals presenting with GF tumors may have no other signs of FAP until months or years after the initial presentation, i.e. GF tumors may be the first indication that an individual has FAP.

Desmoid tumors may arise sporadically or in 5–10% of cases in association with FAP. In sporadic cases, these tumors occur most frequently in the abdominal wall, intra-abdominal cavity, and limbs. They also arise as natural progressions of GF tumors, that follow trauma to GF tumors, or that recur in surgically removed GF tumors; these progressions are sometimes termed the "GF–DF sequence". DTs that replace GF tumors are benign but typically are rapidly growing, painful, tend to infiltrate into nearby tissues, and after their surgical removal often recur at the surgical sites. Desmoid tumors that are not associated with FAP almost always have tumor cells that express mutations in the CTNNB1 gene. This gene directs the production of catenin beta-1 protein and when mutated in desmoid tumor cells overproduces a fully active product protein that contributes to the unregulated growth of its parent cells.

Individuals presenting with a GF (or DT) should be assessed for the presence of other FAP lesions such as colon and rectal polyps as well as for a family history of FAP and for family members with FAP-like lesions in order to determine if these individuals' GF tumors may or are due to FAP.

== Pathology ==
Microscopic histopathologic examinations of H&E stained GF tumor tissues generally show poorly circumscribed, scarce, bland fibroblasts admixed with dense bundles of collagen (i.e. the predominant structural protein in connective tissue). Slit-like empty spaces and loci of adipose tissue and/or skeletal muscle may also be imbedded in the collagen bundles. Sparse mast cells may be dispersed throughout GF tumors. The outer edges of these tumors may entrap peripheral nerve fibers and blood vessels and may infiltrate into otherwise normal subcutaneous fat tissues. Immunohistochemical examinations show that the tumor cells in GF consistently express CD34 protein. and in two-thirds of cases nuclear β-catenin but not smooth muscle actin or desmin. In one study, all 24 tested cases of GF had tumor cells that expressed nuclear-located cyclin D1 protein and MYC proto-oncogene, bHLH transcription factor protein.

Similar examinations of desmoid tumor tissues reveal a heterogeneous, poorly defined and uniform proliferation of spindle-shaped myofibroblast-like cells (i.e. cells with combine some of the microscopic appearance features of fibroblasts and smooth muscle cells). These cells are embedded within collagen bundles which generally dominate the tumor tissues. Compared to GF tumor tissue, DT tumors are more densely populated by cells and these cells are commonly arrayed in bundles. Unlike GF tumor cells, DT tumor cells do not express CD34 protein and almost always at least partially express smooth muscle actin proteins. Similar to GF tumor cells, desmoid tumor cells express nucleus-located β-catenin in 90% to 95% of cases and do not express desmin. Desmoid tumors cells also usually express vimentin, cytochrome c oxidase subunit II, KIT, PDGFRB, androgen receptor and estrogen receptor beta proteins but not S100, or KIT proteins. In one study, 24% of 104 individuals diagnosed with primary DT tumors and 37% of 122 individuals diagnosed with recurrent DT tumors showed on pathological examination DT areas admixed with adjacent GF areas. Only 4 of these patients had documented FAP.

== Diagnosis ==
The diagnosis of GF depends on: its clinical presentation, i.e. occurrence as solitary plaque-like skin lesions that are located in the dermis of children; patient histories of previously having a GF tumor that was surgically removed; characteristic histopathology findings; tumor cell expressions of CD34 and β-catenin proteins but not smooth muscle actin; and the presence of other lesions associated with FAP, a family history of FAP, and/or family members with a history of FAP-like lesions.

== Treatment and prognosis ==
Isolated Gardner fibromas are commonly treated by surgical resection. However, systematic examinations on the clinical value of this surgery have not been published. In one study of patients with mixed GF-DT tumors, the average time of recurrence after surgical removal was ~2.5 years for tumors located in the legs, arms, or deep soft tissues of the back and chest wall and ~5 years for tumors located in other sites. In this study, individuals with pure desmoid tumors, i.e. tumors with no areas with the histopathology of Gardner tumors, had an averaged recurrence time of >25 years.

Individual cases of highly aggressive, symptomatic, and/or repeatedly recurring tumors diagnosed as DT but likely including GF-DT tumors have been treated with nonsteroidal anti-inflammatory drugs, antiestrogens (e.g. tamoxifen: desmoid tumor cells express estrogen receptors), radiation therapy, tyrosine kinase inhibitors (e.g. imatinib), and chemotherapy (i.e. multiple drug regimens such as vinblastine combined with methotrexate, doxorubicin combined with dacarbazine, or adriamycin combined with dacarbazine or single drug regimens such as doxorubicin, methotrexate, vinorelbine, or metronomic, i.e. low-dose, long-term treatment, etoposide or cyclophosphamide). These various treatments have had modest success. For example, one study of 62 individuals with DT (likely including GR-DT tumors) had a complete response, partial response, stable disease, and progressive disease in 1, 12, 37, and 12 patients, respectively; median progression-free survival time (i.e. interval between treatment and disease progression) was 40.8 months.

Additional recommendations for individuals diagnosed with Gardner fibromas include: 1) long-term follow-ups to check for recurrent disease and the development of other FAP lesions; 2) genetic counseling; 3) mandatory screening (e.g. colonoscopy) for FAP every 6 or 12 months; and 4) surveillance of the individual's parents, siblings, and children for the presence and development of FAP-associated lesions.
