= Angiomyofibroblastoma =

Angiomyofibroblastoma is an uncommon benign mesenchymal tumor. It occurs mostly in the vulvovaginal area of women, but can also be observed in men. The World Health Organization, 2020, reclassified these tumors as a specific type of tumor in the category of fibroblastic and myofibroblastic tumors.

The gross features of AMFB are well-circumscribed. Usually, most tumors grow slowly, and patients do not feel pain. It also has low tendency for local recurrence.

== Location ==
- In women
  - Female genital tract
  - Vulva
  - Posterior perivesical space
- In men
  - Spermatic cord

== Pathology ==
Microscopical examination shows abundant thin-walled blood vessels with hypocellular and hypercellular areas.

=== Immunohistochemistry ===
Almost all tumor cells have immunoreactivity for both desmin and vimentin. It also express estrogen receptors and/or progesterone receptors, but staining for cytokeratin is negative.
