= Fibroma of tendon sheath =

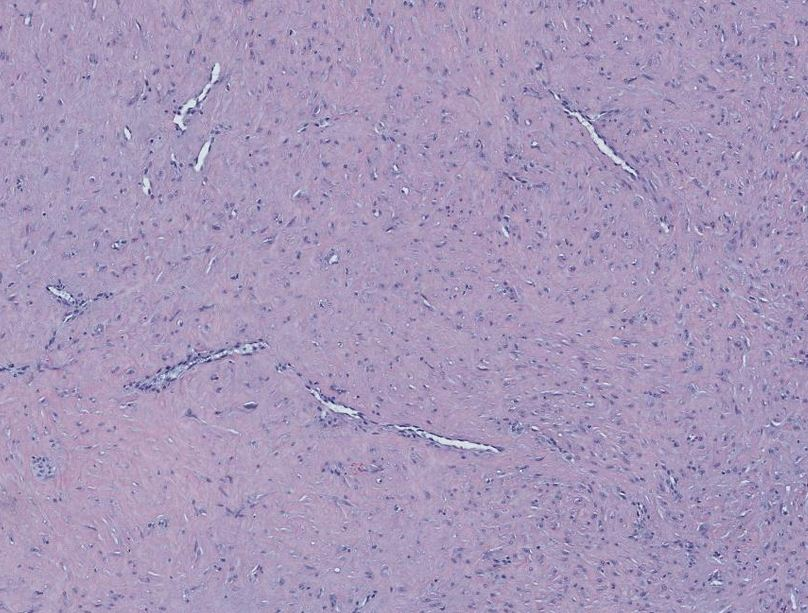
- Photomicrograph of a fibroma of tendon sheath of the finger
- Specialty: Plastic surgery

Fibroma of tendon sheath is a benign tumor that presents as a small subcutaneous nodule that slowly increases in size. This is a notably uncommon condition. According to case reports, the tumors often have a multinodular growth pattern, with individual nodules being composed of bland, slender, spindle-shaped cells (myofibroblasts) in a dense, fibrous matrix.” A common microscopic finding is the presence of elongated, slit-like blood vessels. The lesions nearly always arise in the distal portions of the extremities. They often occur on the fingers, hands, toes, or feet. Although they are benign, they may recur after surgical excision in up to 40% of people.

Although they may be regarded as a tumor of the skin, the lesions arise from tendons and aponeuroses in superficial sites, and are therefore properly classified in the category of soft-tissue tumor. The World Health Organization in 2020 reclassified these tumors as a specific, benign tumor type in a broad category of soft tissue neoplasms termed fibroblastic and myofibroblastic tumors.

The biological nature of fibroma of tendon sheath is not known, but the category appears to comprise a number of different pathological processes. It is considered that about one-third of the lesions in this category may be acral variants of the entity nodular fasciitis.

== See also ==
- Giant cell tumor of the tendon sheath
- List of cutaneous conditions
