= Gross pathology =

Macroscopic (visible) signs of disease on organs and other body parts

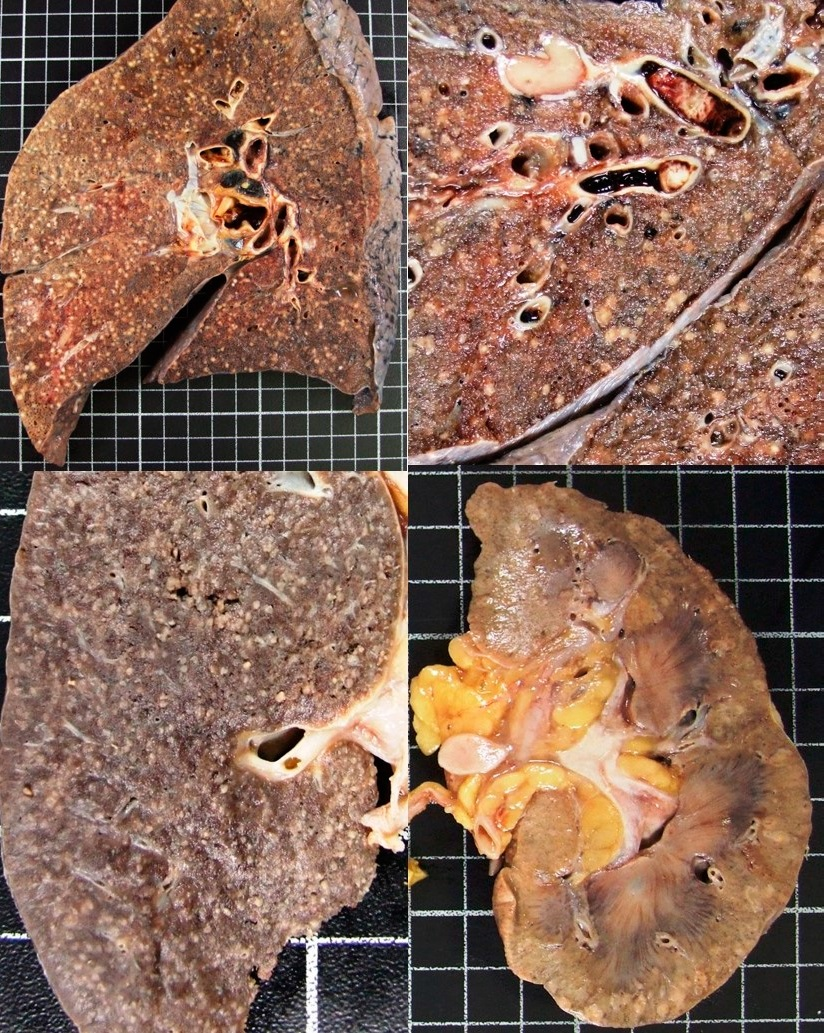
Gross pathology of miliary tuberculosis.

Gross pathology, also known as grossing, refers to macroscopic manifestations of disease in organs, tissues, and body cavities. The term is commonly used by anatomical pathologists to refer to diagnostically useful findings made during the gross examination portion of surgical specimen processing or an autopsy.

In the intricate process of anatomical pathology, the grossing stage plays a pivotal role. It is vital to systematically explain the gross appearance of a pathological state, for example, a malignant tumor, noting the site, size, shape, consistency, presence of a capsule and appearance on cut section whether well circumscribed or diffusely infiltrating, homogeneous or variegated, cystic, necrotic, hemorrhagic areas, as well as papillary projections.

Therefore, upon receipt of a specimen, pathologists meticulously document its characteristics. They note the specimen's dimensions, hue, texture, and any distinctive features that stand out. This careful observation lays the groundwork for the subsequent steps. Following this, the tissue is delicately sectioned and securely placed into cassettes, each identified by a unique barcode. This systematic approach ensures precision and traceability, hallmarks of the highest standards in pathology.
