= CD34 =

Protein found in humans

Identifiers
- Aliases: CD34, entrez:947, CD34 molecule
- External IDs: OMIM: 142230; MGI: 88329; GeneCards: CD34

Gene location (Human)
Chr.	Chromosome 1 (human)
Band	1q32.2	Start	207,880,972 bp
Band	1q32.2	End	207,911,402 bp

Gene location (Mouse)
Chr.	Chromosome 1 (mouse)
Band	1 H6|1 98.38 cM	Start	194,621,127 bp
Band	1 H6|1 98.38 cM	End	194,643,587 bp
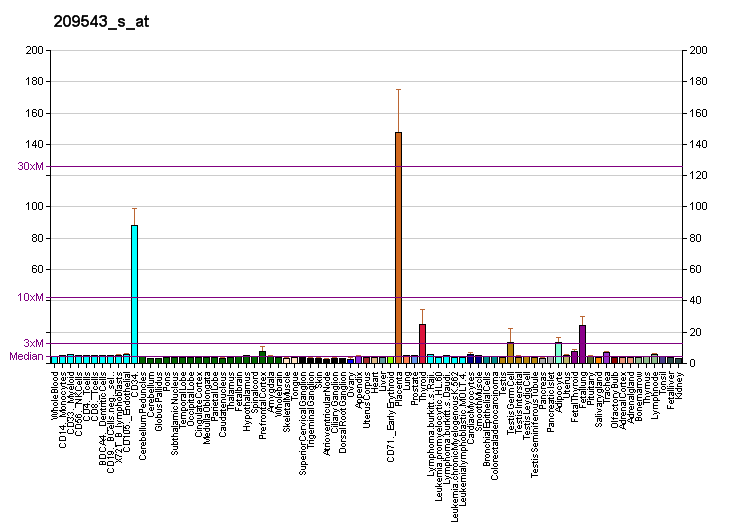
RNA expression pattern
Bgee	Human / Mouse (ortholog); Top expressed in: apex of heart; right auricle of heart; gastric mucosa; subcutaneous adipose tissue; Descending thoracic aorta; left uterine tube; right lobe of thyroid gland; tibial nerve; body of uterus; right coronary artery / Top expressed in: vasculature of trunk; efferent ductule; ankle; lip; left lung lobe; uterus; carotid body; dermis; cervix; skin of abdomen; More reference expression data
BioGPS	More reference expression data
Gene ontology
Molecular function	transcription factor binding; sulfate binding; carbohydrate binding
Cellular component	cytoplasm; integral component of membrane; membrane; plasma membrane; integral component of plasma membrane; extracellular region; cell surface; basal plasma membrane; glomerular endothelium fenestra; apical plasma membrane; intercellular bridge; perinuclear region of cytoplasm; lysosome; external side of plasma membrane; cell periphery
Biological process	extracellular exosome assembly; stem cell proliferation; positive regulation of interleukin-10 production; cell motility; negative regulation of blood coagulation; metanephric glomerular mesangial cell differentiation; paracrine signaling; hematopoietic stem cell proliferation; positive regulation of granulocyte colony-stimulating factor production; negative regulation of gene expression; positive regulation of angiogenesis; regulation of blood pressure; vascular wound healing; positive regulation of gene expression; glomerular filtration; negative regulation of nitric oxide biosynthetic process; cell adhesion; endothelial cell proliferation; mesangial cell-matrix adhesion; tissue homeostasis; positive regulation of vasculogenesis; endothelium development; regulation of immune response; negative regulation of cellular response to heat; positive regulation of transforming growth factor beta production; glomerular endothelium development; negative regulation of tumor necrosis factor production; cell-matrix adhesion; cell population proliferation; positive regulation of odontogenesis; negative regulation of cellular response to hypoxia; leukocyte migration; signal transduction; transdifferentiation; negative regulation of neuron death; cell-cell adhesion; hemopoiesis
Sources:Amigo / QuickGO
Orthologs
Databases	NCBI: entry; OMA: entry
Species	Human	Mouse
Entrez	947	12490
Ensembl	ENSG00000174059	ENSMUSG00000016494
UniProt	P28906	Q64314
RefSeq (mRNA)	NM_001025109; NM_001773	NM_001111059; NM_133654
RefSeq (protein)	NP_001020280; NP_001764	NP_001104529; NP_598415
Location (UCSC)	Chr 1: 207.88 – 207.91 Mb	Chr 1: 194.62 – 194.64 Mb
PubMed search
- Wikidata
View/Edit Human	View/Edit Mouse

CD34 is a transmembrane phosphoglycoprotein protein encoded by the CD34 gene in humans, mice, rats and other species.

CD34 derives its name from the cluster of differentiation protocol that identifies cell surface antigens. CD34 was first described as a cell surface glycoprotein on hematopoietic stem cells and functions as a cell-cell adhesion factor. It may also mediate the attachment of hematopoietic stem cells to bone marrow extracellular matrix or directly to stromal cells. Clinically, it is associated with the selection and enrichment of hematopoietic stem cells for bone marrow transplants. Due to these historical and clinical associations, CD34 expression is almost ubiquitously related to hematopoietic cells; however, it is actually found on many other cell types as well.

== Function ==
The CD34 protein is a member of a family of single-pass transmembrane sialomucin proteins that show expression on early haematopoietic and vascular-associated progenitor cells. However, little is known about its exact function.

CD34 is also an important adhesion molecule and is required for T cells to enter lymph nodes. It is expressed on lymph node endothelia, whereas the L-selectin to which it binds is on the T cell. Conversely, under other circumstances CD34 has been shown to act as molecular "Teflon" and block mast cell, eosinophil and dendritic cell precursor adhesion, and to facilitate opening of vascular lumina. Finally, recent data suggest CD34 may also play a more selective role in chemokine-dependent migration of eosinophils and dendritic cell precursors. Regardless of its mode of action, under all circumstances CD34, and its relatives podocalyxin and endoglycan, facilitates cell migration.

== Tissue distribution ==
CD34 is expressed in hematopoietic progenitor cells and endothelial cells of blood vessels. Thus, it has been used as a marker for capillaries and blood vessels. One of the most densely vascular organs is the kidney, wherein networks of capillaries are intertwined with renal tubules. In kidney sections, these networks of capillaries have been visualized by confocal microscopy of fluorescently labelled anti-CD34 antibodies. The presence of CD34 on non-hematopoietic cells in various tissues has been linked to progenitor and adult stem cell phenotypes.

It is important to mention that Long-Term Haematopoietic Stem Cells (LT-HSCs) in mice and humans are the haematopoietic cells with the greatest self-renewal capacity and were shown to be CD34^{+} and CD38^{−} cell fraction within the lineage-depleted cell population (LIn^{−}). Human HSCs express the CD34 marker. Later studies have reported that low rhodamine retention identifies LT-HSCs within the Lin^{−}CD34^{+}CD38^{−} population.

CD34 is expressed in roughly 20% of murine haematopoietic stem cells, and can be stimulated and reversed.

== Clinical applications ==
CD34+ is often used clinically to quantify the number of haemopoietic stem cells for use in haemopoietic stem cell transplantation. This is generally a useful marker for cell dosing although there is some evidence that the CD34+ quantification may not be reliable in some circumstances. CD34+ cells may be isolated from blood samples using immunomagnetic techniques and used for CD34+ transplants, which have lower rates of graft-versus-host disease.

Antibodies are used to quantify and purify hematopoietic progenitor stem cells for research and for clinical bone marrow transplantation. However, counting CD34+ mononuclear cells may overestimate myeloid blasts in bone marrow smears due to hematogones (B lymphocyte precursors) and CD34+ megakaryocytes.

Cells observed as CD34+ and CD38- are of an undifferentiated, primitive form; i.e., they are multipotent hematopoietic stem cells. Thus, because of their CD34+ expression, such undifferentiated cells can be sorted out.

In tumors, CD34 is found in alveolar soft part sarcoma, preB-ALL (positive in 75%), AML (40%), AML-M7 (most), dermatofibrosarcoma protuberans, gastrointestinal stromal tumors, giant cell fibroblastoma, granulocytic sarcoma, Kaposi’s sarcoma, liposarcoma, malignant fibrous histiocytoma, malignant peripheral nerve sheath tumors, meningeal hemangiopericytomas, meningiomas, neurofibromas, schwannomas, and papillary thyroid carcinoma.

A negative CD34 may exclude Ewing's sarcoma/PNET, myofibrosarcoma of the breast, and inflammatory myofibroblastic tumors of the stomach.

Injection of CD34+ hematopoietic stem cells has been clinically applied to treat various diseases including spinal cord injury, liver cirrhosis and peripheral vascular disease.

== Interactions ==
CD34 has been shown to interact with CRKL. It also interacts with L-selectin, important in inflammation. CD34- has been related to hair follicles' melanocyte regeneration and CD34+ with neuronal regeneration.

== See also ==
- Cluster of differentiation
- List of histologic stains that aid in diagnosis of cutaneous conditions
