= Dupuytren's contracture =

Medical condition featuring permanent bending of fingers

- Other names: Dupuytren's disease, Morbus Dupuytren, palmar fibromatosis, Viking disease, Viking hand, and Celtic hand, contraction of palmar fascia, palmar fascial fibromatosis, palmar fibromas
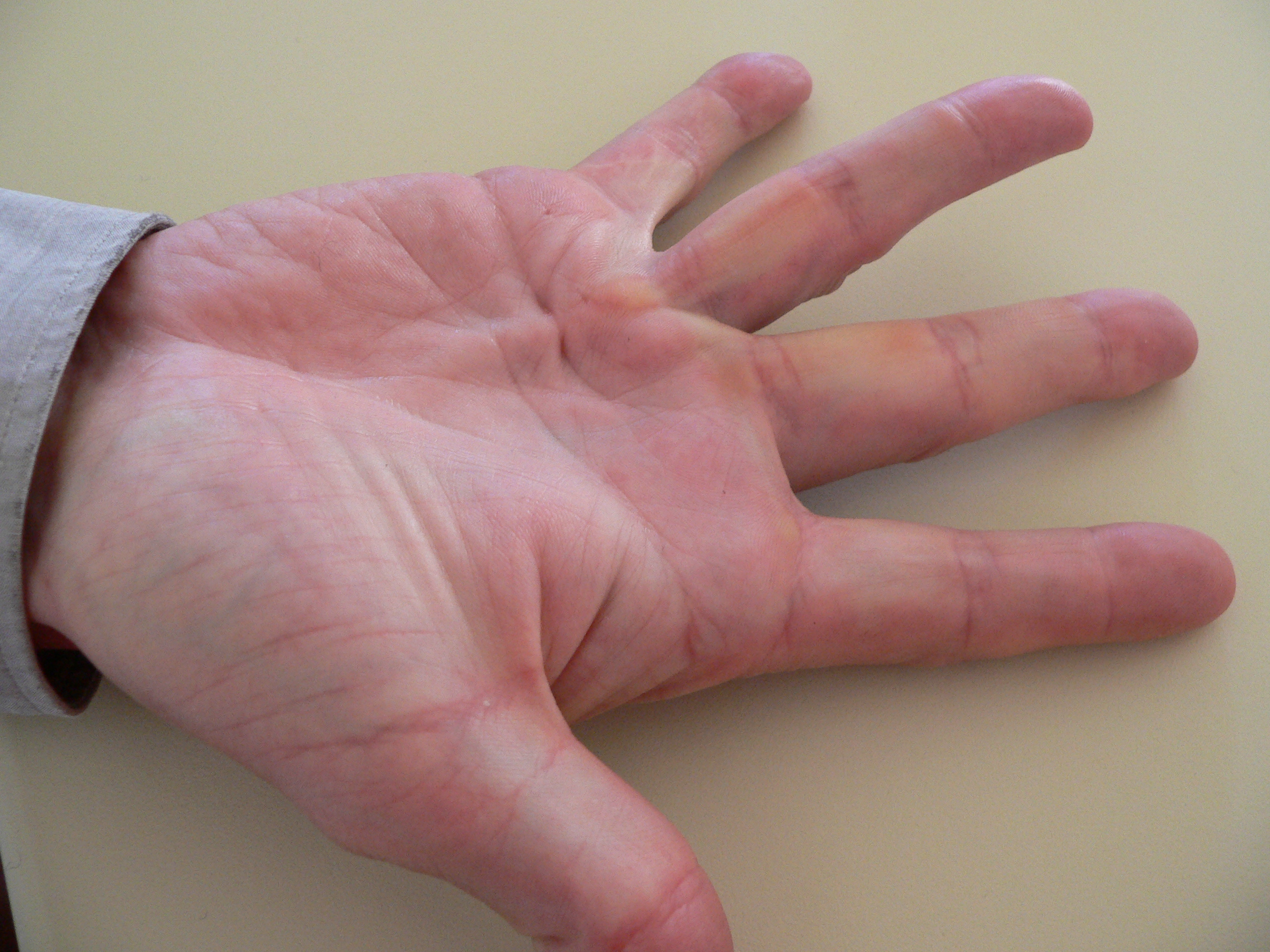
- Dupuytren's contracture of the ring finger
- Pronunciation: /dəˌpwiːˈtræ̃z, -ˈpwiːtrənz/
- Specialty: Rheumatology
- Symptoms: One or more fingers permanently bent in a flexed position, hard nodule just under the skin of the palm
- Complications: Trouble preparing food or writing
- Usual onset: Gradual onset in males over 50
- Causes: Unknown
- Risk factors: Family history, smoking, thyroid problems, liver disease, diabetes, epilepsy, Neanderthal ancestry
- Diagnostic method: Based on symptoms
- Treatment: Steroid injections, clostridial collagenase injections, surgery
- Frequency: ~5% (US)

Dupuytren's contracture (also called Dupuytren's disease, Morbus Dupuytren, Palmar fibromatosis and colloquially Viking disease, Viking hand or Celtic hand) is a condition in which one or more fingers become permanently bent in a flexed position. It is named after Guillaume Dupuytren, who first described the underlying mechanism of action, followed by the first successful operation in 1831 and publication of the results in The Lancet in 1834. It usually begins as small, hard nodules just under the skin of the palm, then worsens over time until the fingers can no longer be fully straightened. While typically not painful, some aching or itching, or pain, may be present. The ring finger followed by the little and middle fingers are most commonly affected. It can affect one or both hands. The condition can interfere with activities such as preparing food, writing, putting the hand in a tight pocket, putting on gloves, or shaking hands.

The causes of Dupuytren's contracture are not completely understood. The disease is driven by over-activation of fibroblasts and myofibroblasts in response to signaling molecules including IL-1 beta, TGF-beta, EGF, and CTGF, leading to inappropriately increased formation of fibrous connective tissue. Risk factors include family history, smoking, thyroid problems, liver disease, diabetes, previous hand trauma, and epilepsy. The development of Dupuytren disease has also been associated with environmental factors, including smoking, alcohol consumption, aging, trauma, and repetitive use of the hand in certain physical occupations. Genetic studies have implicated mutations in the Wnt signaling pathway a possible hereditary genetic contributor to the disease, and various somatic chromosomal abnormalities as a non-hereditary or partially hereditary contributing factor.

In 2020, the World Health Organization reclassified Dupuytren's (termed palmar-type fibromatosis) as a specific type of tumor in the category of intermediate (locally aggressive) fibroblastic and myofibroblastic tumors.

Initial treatment is typically with cortisone injected into the affected area, occupational therapy, and physical therapy. Among those who worsen, clostridial collagenase injections or surgery may be tried. Radiation therapy may be used to treat this condition. The Royal College of Radiologists (RCR) Faculty of Clinical Oncology concluded that radiotherapy is effective in early stage disease which has progressed within the last 6 to 12 months. The condition may recur at some time after treatment; it can then be treated again. It is easier to treat when the amount of finger bending is more mild.

Dupuytren's most often occurs in white males over the age of 50 and is rare among Asians and Africans. It sometimes was called "Viking disease," since it was often recorded among those of Nordic descent. In Norway, about 30% of men over 60 years old have the condition, while in the United States about 5% of people are affected at some point in time. In the United Kingdom, about 20% of people over 65 have some form of the disease.

== Signs and symptoms ==
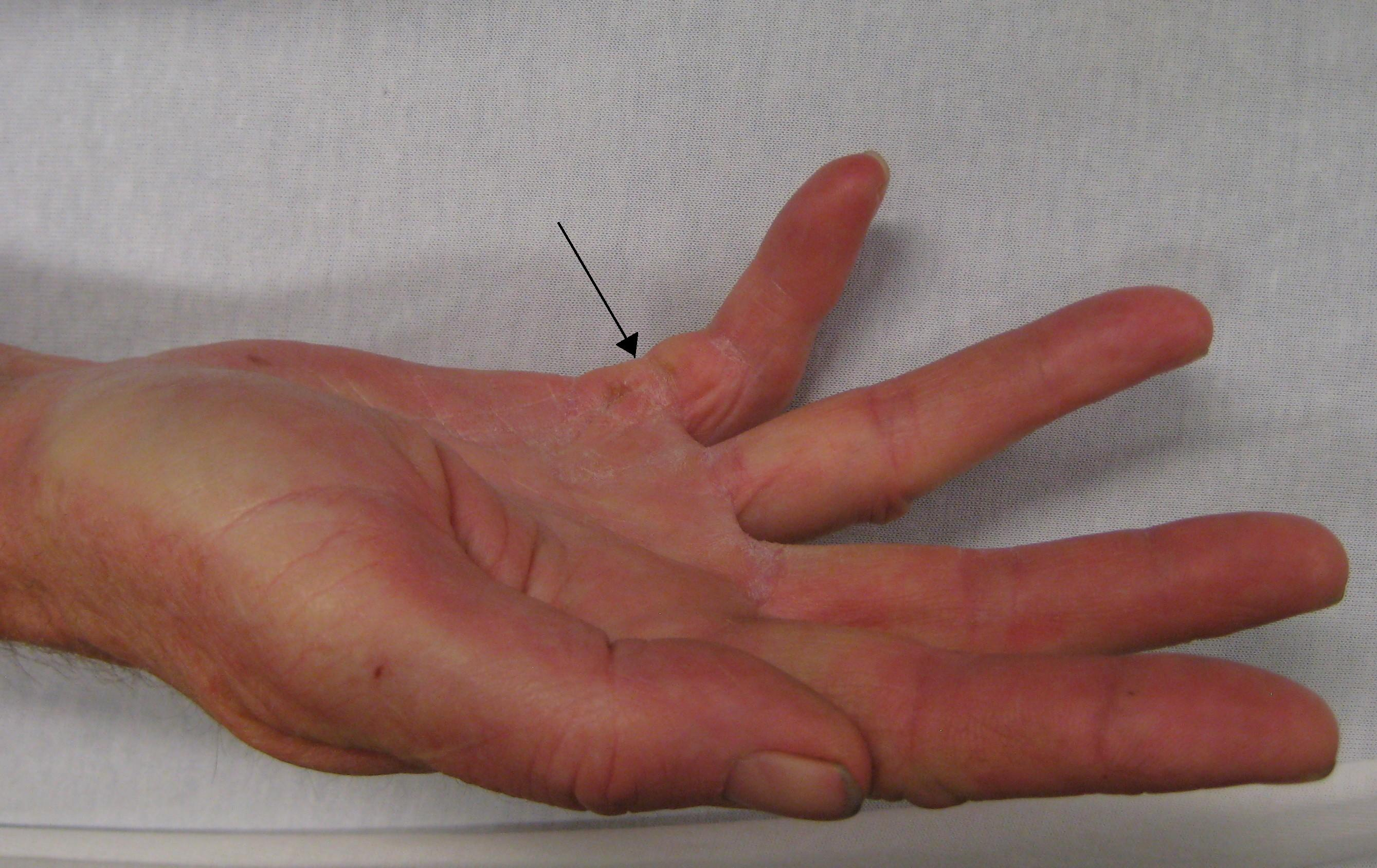
Dupuytren's contracture of the right little finger. Arrow marks the area of scarring.

Typically, Dupuytren's contracture first presents as a thickening or nodule in the palm, which initially can be with or without pain. Later in the disease process, which can be years later, there is increasing loss of range of motion of the affected finger(s). The earliest sign of a contracture is a triangular "puckering" of the skin of the palm as it passes over the flexor tendon just before the flexor crease of the finger, at the metacarpophalangeal (MCP) joint.

Late stage Dupuytren's contracture upon the left hand affecting the little finger and the ring finger but not the index finger and middle finger

Dupuytren disease is generally considered painless, but can be painful if nerve tissue is involved, although this is not usually discussed in the literature. The most common finger to be affected is the ring finger; the thumb and index finger are much less often affected. The disease begins in the palm and moves towards the fingers, with the metacarpophalangeal (MCP) joints affected before the proximal interphalangeal (PIP) joints. The MCP joints at the base of the finger responds much better to treatment and are usually able to fully extend after treatment. Due to anatomic differences in the ligaments and extensor tendons at the PIP joints, they may have some residual flexion. Proper patient education is necessary to set realistic treatment expectation. In Dupuytren's contracture, the palmar fascia within the hand becomes abnormally thick, which can cause the fingers to curl and can impair finger function. The main function of the palmar fascia is to increase grip strength; thus, over time, Dupuytren's contracture decreases a person's ability to hold objects and use the hand in many different activities. Dupuytren's contracture can also be experienced as embarrassing in social situations and can affect quality of life. People may report pain, aching, and itching with the contractions. Normally, the palmar fascia consists of collagen type I, but in Dupuytren patients, the collagen changes to collagen type III, which is significantly thicker than collagen type I.

=== Related conditions ===
People with severe involvement often show lumps on the back of their finger joints (called "Garrod's pads", "knuckle pads", or "dorsal Dupuytren nodules"), and lumps in the arch of the feet (plantar fibromatosis or Ledderhose disease). In severe cases, the area where the palm meets the wrist may develop lumps. It is thought the condition Peyronie's disease is related to Dupuytren's contracture.

In one study those with stage 2 of the disease were found to have a slightly increased risk of mortality, especially from cancer.

== Risk factors ==
Many risk factors have been suggested or identified:

=== Non-modifiable ===
- Scandinavian or Northern European ancestry; Dupuytren's has been called the "Viking disease", though it is also widespread in some Mediterranean countries, e.g., Spain and Bosnia. Dupuytren's is uncommon among groups including Chinese and Africans.
- In June 2023 a study found that gene variants that were inherited from Neanderthals dramatically increased the odds of developing the condition
- Male sex; men are 80% more likely to develop the condition
- Age of 50 or over (5% to 15% of men in that group in the US); the likelihood of getting Dupuytren's disease increases with age
- A family history (60% to 70% of those affected have a genetic predisposition to Dupuytren's contracture)

=== Modifiable ===
- Smoking, especially 25-plus cigarettes per day
- Lower-than-average body mass index (thinness).
- Manual work: a 2023 paper by researchers at the University of Groningen Medical Centre and Oxford University, "Dupuytren's disease is a work-related disorder: results of a population-based cohort study", found that people whose jobs involved significant manual work were 1.29 times more likely to develop Dupuytren's disease than others, with a linear dose–response relationship with cumulative manual labour over 30 years.

=== Other conditions ===
- Previous hand injury
- Ledderhose disease (plantar fibromatosis)
- Epilepsy (possibly due to anti-convulsive medication)
- Higher-than-average fasting blood glucose level
- Diabetes mellitus
- HIV
- Macrophallism
- Previous myocardial infarction

== Pathophysiology ==
Dupuytren’s contracture is a fibroproliferative disorder of the palmar fascia in which abnormal activation of fibroblasts and myofibroblasts, driven by mediators such as transforming growth factor-beta, platelet-derived growth factor, epidermal growth factor, interleukin-1 beta, and connective tissue growth factor, leads to excess deposition of type III collagen and progressive remodeling of fascial tissue. Studies have suggested that intracellular signaling, as opposed to paracrine or endocrine signaling, may be the strongest driver of abnormal fibroblast activity in most cases of Dupuytren's contracture.

The disease typically evolves through a proliferative stage marked by cellular nodules rich in immature fibroblasts and myofibroblasts, an involution stage in which these cells align along longitudinal stress lines in the hand, and a residual stage in which dense, relatively hypocellular collagenous cords persist and mechanically flex the digits. As normal fascial structures are converted into pathologic cords, characteristic deformities emerge: central cords commonly produce skin puckering and metacarpophalangeal contracture, natatory cords (developed from the natatory ligament) narrow the web spaces, and spiral cords can cause proximal interphalangeal contracture while displacing the digital neurovascular bundle. Although the condition may remain stable or even regress in many patients, greater severity and recurrence are associated with strong hereditary influence and related fibromatoses, and genetic studies increasingly implicate dysregulated Wnt signaling as an important contributor to disease susceptibility and progression.

== Diagnosis ==
=== Types ===
There may be three types of Dupuytren's disease:

- Type 1: An aggressive form of the disease found in only 3% of people with Dupuytren's, which can affect men under 50 with a family history of Dupuytren's. It is often associated with other symptoms such as knuckle pads and Ledderhose disease. This type is sometimes known as Dupuytren's diathesis.
- Type 2: The more normal type of Dupuytren's disease, usually found in the palm only, and which generally begins above the age of 50. This type may be made more severe by other factors such as diabetes or heavy manual labor.
- Type 3: A mild form of Dupuytren's which is common among diabetics or which may also be caused by certain medications, such as the anti-convulsants taken by people with epilepsy. This type does not lead to full contracture of the fingers, and is probably not inherited.

== Treatment ==
Treatment is indicated when the so-called table-top test is positive. With this test, the person places their hand on a table. If the hand lies completely flat on the table, the test is considered negative. If the hand cannot be placed completely flat on the table, leaving a space between the table and a part of the hand as big as the diameter of a ballpoint pen, the test is considered positive and surgery or other treatment may be indicated. Additionally, finger joints may become fixed and rigid. There are several types of treatment, with some hands needing repeated treatment.

The main categories listed by the International Dupuytren Society in order of stage of disease are radiation therapy, needle aponeurotomy (NA), collagenase injection, and hand surgery. As of 2016 the evidence on the efficacy of radiation therapy was considered inadequate in quantity and quality, and difficult to interpret because of uncertainty about the natural history of Dupuytren's disease.

Needle aponeurotomy is most effective for Stages I and II, covering 6–90 degrees of deformation of the finger. However, it is also used at other stages. Collagenase injection is likewise most effective for Stages I and II. However, it is also used at other stages.

Hand surgery is effective at stage I to stage IV.

Use of a splint to keep treated fingers straight following various forms of treatment, typically at all times for some days, then at nighttime for some weeks, is usual. However, a 2015 Cochrane review concluded: "low-quality evidence suggests that postoperative splinting may not improve outcomes and may impair outcomes by reducing active flexion. Further trials on this topic are urgently required".

=== Surgery ===
On 12 June 1831, Dupuytren performed a surgical procedure on a person with contracture of the fourth and fifth digits who had been previously told by other surgeons that the only remedy was cutting the flexor tendons. He described the condition and the operation in The Lancet in 1834 after presenting it in 1833, and posthumously in 1836 in a French publication by Hôtel-Dieu de Paris. The procedure he described was a minimally invasive needle procedure.

Because of high recurrence rates, new surgical techniques were introduced, such as fasciectomy and then dermofasciectomy. Most of the diseased tissue is removed with these procedures.Recurrence rates are low. For some individuals, the partial insertion of "K-wires" into either the DIP or PIP joint of the affected digit for a period of a least 21 days to fuse the joint is the only way to halt the disease's progress. After removal of the wires, the joint is fixed into flexion, which is considered preferable to fusion at extension.

Research using large datasets in the UK has shown surgery to be safe and effective. When surgery needs to be repeated, however, the research suggests there are higher risks of serious complications such as finger amputation. Amputation of fingers may be needed for severe or recurrent cases or after surgical complications.

==== Limited fasciectomy ====
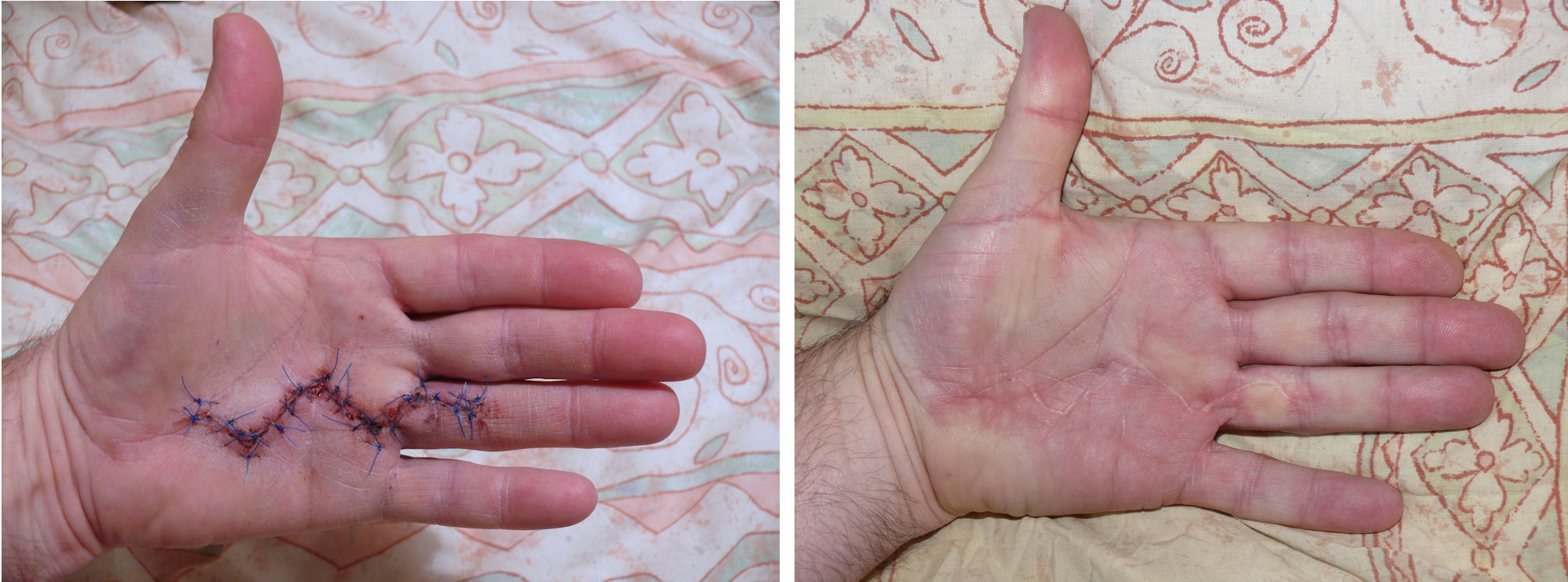
Hand immediately after surgery, and completely healed

Limited/selective fasciectomy removes the pathological tissue, and is a common approach. A 2015 Cochrane review reported that low-quality evidence suggested that fasciectomy may be more effective for people with advanced Dupuytren's contractures.

During the procedure, the person is under regional or general anesthesia. A surgical tourniquet prevents blood flow to the limb. The skin is often opened with a zig-zag incision but straight incisions with or without Z-plasty are also described and may reduce damage to neurovascular bundles. All diseased cords and fascia are excised. The excision has to be very precise to spare the neurovascular bundles. Because not all the diseased tissue is visible macroscopically, complete excision is uncertain.

A 20-year review of surgical complications associated with fasciectomy showed that major complications occurred in 15.7% of cases, including digital nerve injury (3.4%), digital artery injury (2%), infection (2.4%), hematoma (2.1%), and complex regional pain syndrome (5.5%), in addition to minor complications including painful flare reactions in 9.9% of cases and wound healing complications in 22.9% of cases. After the tissue is removed the incision is closed. In the case of a shortage of skin, the transverse part of the zig-zag incision is left open. Stitches are removed 10 days after surgery.

After surgery, the hand is wrapped in a light compressive bandage for one week. Flexion and extension of the fingers can start as soon as the anaesthesia has resolved. It is common to experience tingling within the first week after surgery. Hand therapy is often recommended. Approximately six weeks after surgery the patient is able completely to use the hand.

The average recurrence rate is 39% after a fasciectomy after a median interval of about four years.

==== Wide-awake fasciectomy ====
Limited/selective fasciectomy under local anesthesia (LA) with epinephrine but no tourniquet is possible. In 2005, Denkler described the technique.

==== Dermofasciectomy ====
Dermofasciectomy is a surgical procedure that may be used when:

- The skin is clinically involved (pits, tethering, deficiency, etc.)
- The risk of recurrence is high and the skin appears uninvolved (subclinical skin involvement occurs in ~50% of cases)
- Recurrent disease. Similar to a limited fasciectomy, the dermofasciectomy removes diseased cords, fascia, and the overlying skin.

Typically, the excised skin is replaced with a skin graft, usually full thickness, consisting of the epidermis and the entire dermis. In most cases the graft is taken from the antecubital fossa (the crease of skin at the elbow joint) or the inner side of the upper arm. This place is chosen because the skin color best matches the palm's skin color. The skin on the inner side of the upper arm is thin and has enough skin to supply a full-thickness graft. The donor site can be closed with a direct suture.

The graft is sutured to the skin surrounding the wound. For one week the hand is protected with a dressing. The hand and arm are elevated with a sling. The dressing is then removed and careful mobilization can be started, gradually increasing in intensity. After this procedure the risk of recurrence is minimised, but Dupuytren's can recur in the skin graft and complications from surgery may occur.

==== Segmental fasciectomy with/without cellulose ====
Segmental fasciectomy involves excising part(s) of the contracted cord so that it disappears or no longer contracts the finger. It is less invasive than the limited fasciectomy, because not all the diseased tissue is excised and the skin incisions are smaller.

The person is placed under regional anesthesia and a surgical tourniquet is used. The skin is opened with small curved incisions over the diseased tissue. If necessary, incisions are made in the fingers. Pieces of cord and fascia of approximately one centimeter are excised. The cords are placed under maximum tension while they are cut. A scalpel is used to separate the tissues. The surgeon keeps removing small parts until the finger can fully extend. The patient is encouraged to start moving their hand the day after surgery. After surgery people wear a light pressure dressing for four days, followed by an extension splint, typically continuously for a few weeks, then every night for eight weeks.

The same procedure is used in the segmental fasciectomy with cellulose implant. After the excision and a careful hemostasis, the cellulose implant is placed in a single layer in between the remaining parts of the cord.

=== Less invasive treatments ===
Studies have been conducted for percutaneous release, extensive percutaneous aponeurotomy with lipografting and collagenase. These treatments show promise.

==== Percutaneous needle fasciotomy ====
Needle aponeurotomy is a minimally-invasive technique where the cords are weakened through the insertion and manipulation of a small needle. It is applicable only if the contracture is clearly visible. The hand is first numbed by injection with local anaesthetic. The cord is then sectioned at as many levels as possible in the palm and fingers, depending on the location and extent of the disease, using perhaps a 25-gauge needle mounted on a 10 ml syringe. Once weakened, the offending cords can be snapped by putting tension on the finger(s) and pulling the finger(s) straight. After the treatment a small dressing is applied for 24 hours, after which people are able to use their hands normally. No splints or physiotherapy are given.

The advantage of needle aponeurotomy is the minimal intervention without incision (done in the office under local anesthesia) and the very rapid return to normal activities without need for rehabilitation, but the nodules may resume growing. A study reported postoperative gain is greater at the MCP joint level than at the level of the IP-joint and found a reoperation rate of 24%; complications are scarce. Needle aponeurotomy may be performed on fingers that are severely bent (stage IV), and not just in early stages. A 2003 study showed 85% recurrence rate after five years.

A comprehensive review of the results of needle aponeurotomy in 1,013 fingers was performed by Gary M. Pess, MD, Rebecca Pess, DPT, and Rachel Pess, PsyD, and published in The Journal of Hand Surgery April 2012. Minimal follow-up was three years. Metacarpophalangeal joint (MP) contractures were corrected at an average of 99% and proximal interphalangeal joint (PIP) contractures at an average of 89% immediately post procedure. At final follow-up, 72% of the correction was maintained for MP joints and 31% for PIP joints. The difference between the final corrections for MP versus PIP joints was statistically significant. When comparing people aged below and above 55 years of age there was a statistically significant difference at both MP and PIP joints, with greater correction maintained in the older group.

Gender differences were not statistically significant. Needle aponeurotomy provided successful correction to 5° or less contracture immediately post procedure in 98% (791) of MP joints and 67% (350) of PIP joints. There was recurrence of 20° or less over the original post-procedure corrected level in 80% (646) of MP joints and 35% (183) of PIP joints. Complications were rare except for skin tears, which occurred in 3.4% (34) of digits. This study showed that NA is a safe procedure that can be performed in an outpatient setting. The complication rate was low, but recurrences were frequent in younger people and for PIP contractures.

==== Extensive percutaneous aponeurotomy and lipografting ====
A technique introduced in 2011 is extensive percutaneous aponeurotomy with lipografting. This procedure also uses a needle to cut the cords. The difference with the percutaneous needle fasciotomy is that the cord is cut at many places. The cord is also separated from the skin to make place for the lipograft that is taken from the abdomen or ipsilateral flank. This technique shortens the recovery time. The fat graft results in supple skin.

Before the aponeurotomy, a liposuction is done to the abdomen and ipsilateral flank to collect the lipograft. The treatment can be performed under regional or general anesthesia. The digits are placed under maximal extension tension using a firm lead hand retractor. The surgeon makes multiple palmar puncture wounds with small nicks. The tension on the cords is crucial, because tight constricting bands are most susceptible to be cut and torn by the small nicks, whereas the relatively loose neurovascular structures are spared. After the cord is completely cut and separated from the skin the lipograft is injected under the skin. A total of about 5 to 10 ml is injected per ray.

After the treatment the person wears an extension splint for 5 to 7 days. Thereafter the person returns to normal activities and is advised to use a night splint for up to 20 weeks.

==== Collagenase ====
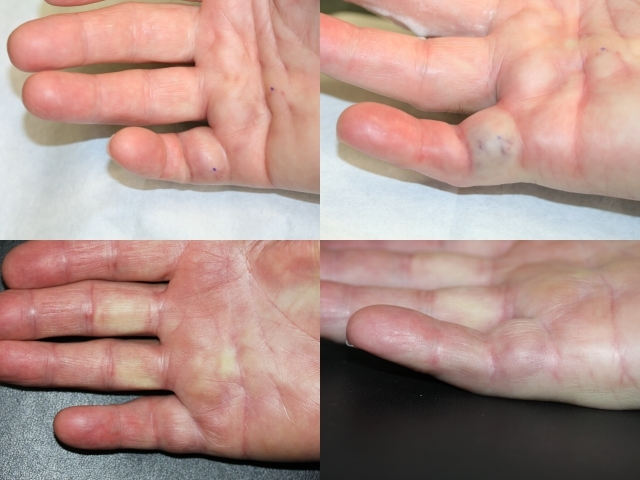
Collagenase enzyme injection: before, next day, and two weeks after first treatment

The cords are weakened through the injection of small amounts of the enzyme collagenase, which breaks peptide bonds in collagen.

Clostridial collagenase injections have been found to be more effective than placebo.

In February 2010 the US Food and Drug Administration (FDA) approved injectable collagenase extracted from Clostridium histolyticum for the treatment of Dupuytren's contracture in adults with a palpable Dupuytren's cord. (Three years later, it was approved as well for the treatment of the sometimes related Peyronie's disease.) In 2011 its use for the treatment of Dupuytren's contracture was approved as well by the European Medicines Agency, and it received similar approval in Australia in 2013. However, the Swedish manufacturer withdrew distribution of this drug in Europe including the UK, Australia, and Asia in March 2020. (It is also used in the US as a dermatological treatment for cellulite aka "cottage cheese thighs").

The treatment with collagenase is different for the MCP joint and the PIP joint. In a MCP joint contracture the needle must be placed at the point of maximum bowstringing of the palpable cord. The needle is placed vertically on the bowstring. The collagenase is distributed across three injection points. For the PIP joint the needle must be placed not more than 4 mm distal to palmar digital crease at 2–3 mm depth. The injection for PIP consists of one injection filled with 0.58 mg CCH 0.20 ml. The needle must be placed horizontal to the cord and also uses a three-point distribution. After the injection the person's hand is wrapped in bulky gauze dressing and must be elevated for the rest of the day. After 24 hours the person returns for passive digital extension to rupture the cord. Moderate pressure for 10–20 seconds ruptures the cord. After the treatment with collagenase the person should use a night splint and perform digital flexion/extension exercises several times per day for 4 months.

=== Radiation therapy ===
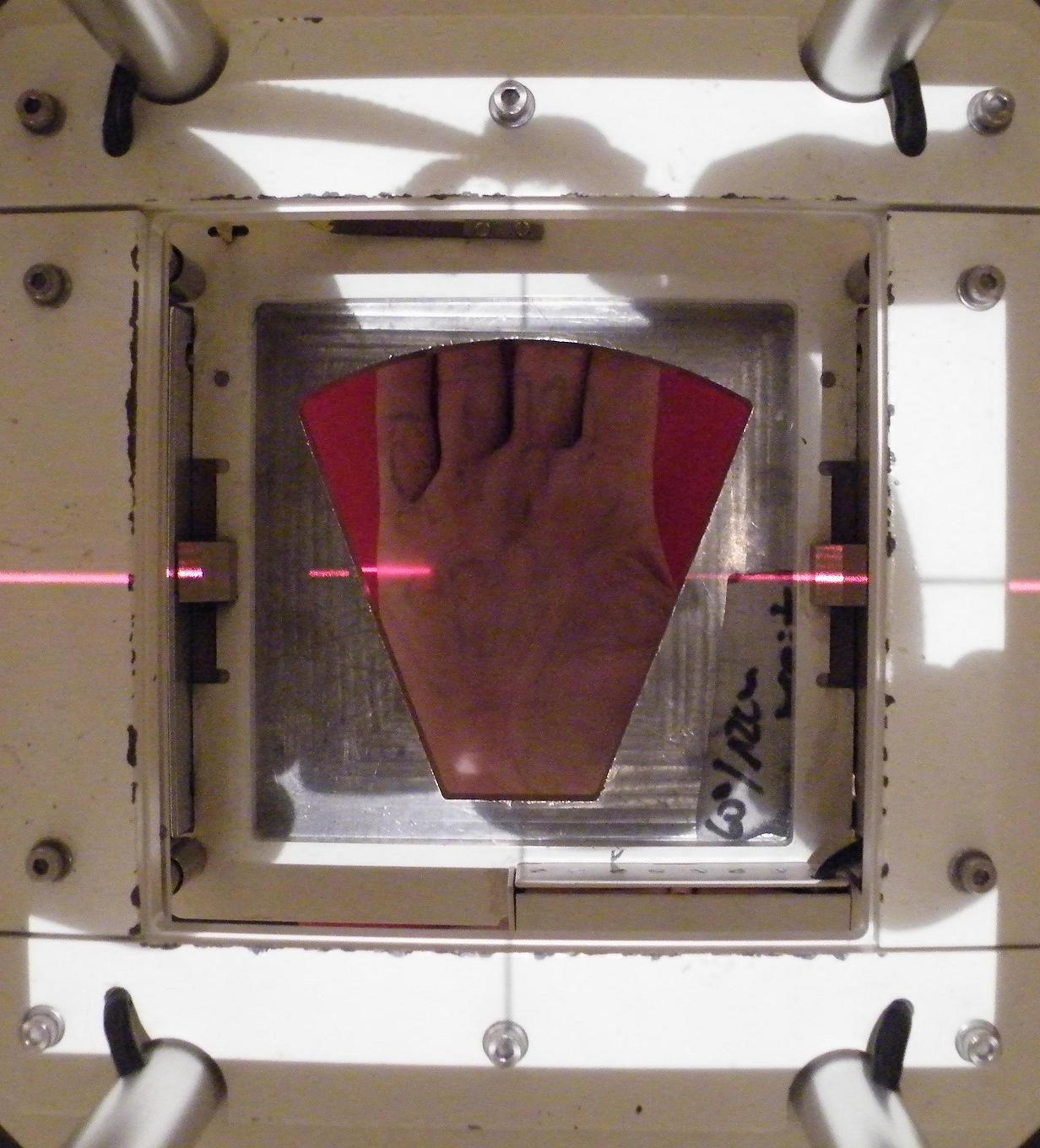
Shows the beam's-eye view of the radiotherapy portal on the hand's surface, with the lead shield cut-out placed in the machine's gantry

Radiation therapy has been used mostly for early-stage disease, but is unproven. Evidence to support its use as of 2017, however, was scarce—efforts to gather evidence are complicated due to a poor understanding of how the condition develops over time. It has been studied in early disease. The Royal College of Radiologists concluded that radiotherapy is effective in early stage disease which has progressed within the last 6 to 12 months.

=== Alternative medicine ===
Several alternate therapies such as vitamin E treatment have been studied, though without control groups. Most doctors do not value those treatments. None of these treatments stops or cures the condition permanently. A 1949 study of vitamin E therapy found that "In twelve of the thirteen patients there was no evidence whatever of any alteration. ... The treatment has been abandoned."

"Cold" laser treatment or "photomodulation" (using red and infrared at low power) was informally discussed in 2013 at an International Dupuytren Society forum, as of which time little or no formal evaluation of the techniques had been completed. The term "photobiomodulation" has expanded to include other low-power light sources such as blue LEDs, making it a form of light therapy rather than specifically a laser-based treatment. No human trials have been performed yet.

In 2021 improvement of Dupuytren's disease in a single patient by ablative laser surgery with a fractionated 10.6 μm carbon-dioxide laser was reported. This is different from a cold laser: in laser surgery, tissue is physically removed by heat by photoablation (also known as "laser blasting").

=== Postoperative care ===
Postoperative care involves hand therapy and splinting. Hand therapy is prescribed to optimize post-surgical function and to prevent joint stiffness. The extent of hand therapy is depending on the patient and the corrective procedure.

Besides hand therapy, many surgeons advise the use of static or dynamic splints after surgery to maintain finger mobility. The splint is used to provide prolonged stretch to the healing tissues and prevent flexion contractures. Although splinting is a widely used post-operative intervention, evidence of its effectiveness is limited, leading to variation in splinting approaches. Most surgeons use clinical experience to decide whether to splint. Cited advantages include maintenance of finger extension and prevention of new flexion contractures. Cited disadvantages include joint stiffness, prolonged pain, discomfort, subsequently reduced function and edema.

A third approach emphasizes early self-exercise and stretching.

== Prognosis ==
Dupuytren's disease has a high recurrence rate, especially when a person has so-called Dupuytren's diathesis. The term diathesis relates to certain features of Dupuytren's disease, and indicates an aggressive course of disease.

The presence of all new Dupuytren's diathesis factors increases the risk of recurrent Dupuytren's disease by 71%, compared with a baseline risk of 23% in people lacking the factors. In another study the prognostic value of diathesis was evaluated. It was concluded that presence of diathesis can predict recurrence and extension. A scoring system was made to evaluate the risk of recurrence and extension, based on the following values: bilateral hand involvement, little-finger surgery, early onset of disease, plantar fibrosis, knuckle pads, and radial side involvement.

Minimally invasive therapies may precede higher recurrence rates. Recurrence lacks a consensus definition. Furthermore, different standards and measurements follow from the various definitions.

== Notable cases ==
- Chelsea Handler (born 1975), American comedian, actress and writer
- Tim Herron (born 1970), American golfer
- Prince Joachim of Denmark (born 1969)
- Joanne Harris (born 1964), British author
- Tommy Lee (born 1962), American drummer
- Ally McCoist (born 1962), Scottish footballer
- Dave Mustaine (born 1961), American guitarist
- Jonathan Agnew (born 1960), English cricketer
- John Elway (born 1960), American football player
- Nanci Griffith (1953–2021), American singer, guitarist, and songwriter
- Bill Murray (born 1950), American actor and comedian
- Bill Nighy (born 1949), British actor
- Mitt Romney (born 1947), American politician
- Misha Dichter (born 1945), American pianist
- José Feliciano (born 1945), Puerto Rican musician, singer and composer
- Bill Frindall (1939–2009), English cricket player and statistician, who had a finger amputated
- David McCallum (1933–2023), Scottish/British actor and musician
- Paul Newman (1925–2008), American actor and film director
- Margaret Thatcher (1925–2013), Prime Minister of the United Kingdom
- Ronald Reagan (1911–2004), American President and actor
- Andrew Wyeth (1917–2009), American visual artist
- Frank Sinatra (1915–1998), American singer, actor, and producer
- Samuel Beckett (1906–1989), Irish novelist, poet and playwright
- Max Planck (1858–1947), German theoretical physicist and Nobel Prize laureate
