= Diffuse infantile fibromatosis =

Rare condition affecting infants

Diffuse infantile fibromatosis is a rare condition affecting infants during the first three years of life. This condition is a multicentric infiltration of muscle fibers with fibroblasts resembling those seen in aponeurotic fibromas, presenting as lesions and tumors confined usually to the muscles of the arms, neck, and shoulder area Diffuse infantile fibromatosis is characterized by fast growing benign tumors. This disorder is known to be caused by mutations in germline variants, PDGFRB and NOTCH3, which may be generationally-inherited through autosomal dominant and recessive traits. Although diffuse infantile fibromatosis is classified as benign, it can still lead to life-threatening complications and damage other organs.

== Classification ==
Fibromatoses as are recurring non-metastasizing tumor growths. They are classified as adult fibromatosis and juvenile, or infantile fibromatosis.

Within infantile fibromatosis, there are two types of tumors, diffuse and desmoid. Desmoid tumors occur in any connective tissue in the body but are often found in the abdomen, shoulders, arms, and thighs. Unlike diffuse tumors, desmoid tumor cannot travel to other parts of the body, however, they can still invade nearby body tissues causing issues. Desmoid tumors are also removed with surgery, but the removal is rarely complete. Clinically, diffuse tumors are typically described as widespread, fast-growing and not localized.

Diffuse infantile fibromatosis is classified as a subset of juvenile/infantile fibromatosis. Infantile fibromatosis is a rare, genetic disorder of the skin, bone, muscle, soft tissue, and internal organs in young children caused by mutations in the genes PDFRB and NOTCH3. It is characterized by benign tumor growth in the affected organ. The tumors spread quickly and they may obstruct the functions of surrounding organs and impair their functions. Cases of infantile fibromatosis appear earlier in life; however, in rare cases it may onset in adulthood. There are treatments available which vary depending on the location of the tumor—surgery being the main one.

Most cases of infantile fibromatosis reported are desmoid fibromatosis. The main difference between the two subtypes of infantile fibromatosis is that diffuse infantile fibromatosis spreads quickly. There is still little information regarding the diffuse infantile subset of fibromatosis and much information on it is based on case studies.

== Signs and symptoms ==
The severity of infantile fibromatosis can vary. Although infantile fibromatosis tumors are benign, these tumors can grow in large masses and damage organs as they expand. Some early signs and symptoms can be observed in the early stage of infancy (90% of cases are observed in children under two years of age). Infantile fibromatosis can be categorized by lesions are that are firm and non-tender, and skin that may be purple or red in color and appears ulcerated and crusted.

According to the National Organization for Rare Disorders (NORD), infantile myofibromatosis can be categorized into different forms. The most common form of infantile myofibromatosis is known as the solitary form. This is mostly found in males around the head, neck or trunk areas. While the lesions are mostly seen on the surface of the skin, they can also extend into the subcutaneous tissue and/or muscle tissue. The second form of infantile myofibromatosis is called the multicentric form without visceral involvement. This form is more commonly found in females, and is characterized by multiple nodules that can occur on the skin, subcutaneous tissue and/or muscle. The most severe form of infantile myofibromatosis, however, is known as the multicentric form with visceral involvement because many organs are typically involved and the growth of the lesion is widespread. This can be categorized as having multiple growths of the skin, muscles, and even internal organs or structures such as the bones, lung, heart, and the GI tract. In this form, life-threatening complications can arise.

== Causes ==
For the majority of cases, infantile myofibromatosis (IM) manifests spontaneously without a known cause. Rarely, multiple family members present with the disorder. In these instances, mutations/variants in the PDGFRB and NOTCH3 genes have been identified as causative. In familial cases of IM, a mutation in the PDGFRB gene was discovered in 18/19 families . Mutations in the NOTCH3 are less common, to date only one family with IM has been identified to have the mutation.

These mutations are caused by errors in DNA replication and they can be either germline or somatic. Germline mutations occur in sperm or egg cells meaning that the mutation can be passed down to future generations. While somatic mutations occur after fertilization during a time of rapid cell division and development. Somatic mutations cannot be passed down to offspring because they do not occur in germ cells (sperm and egg).

Everyone inherits two copies of the same gene, one from either parent. Mutations in one copy or both copies of the gene may result in the development of a disease or disorder. IM may present as either an autosomal dominant or recessive disorder. Autosomal mutations are those not occurring in the X and Y chromosomes. Autosomal dominant disorders are those in which a mutation in one gene is needed for the disorder to manifest, while autosomal recessive disorders need both genes to carry the mutation. IM acts as an autosomal dominant disorder when there is either a germline or somatic mutation in one copy of the PDGFRB gene. In rare cases, IM manifests as an autosomal recessive disorder in individuals who have inherited two mutated NOTCH3 genes.

== Mechanism ==
Although the exact mechanism of diffuse infantile myofibromatosis is not known, mutations in autosomal inherited genes, PDGFRB and NOTCH3, are suspected to play a large role in the formation of the disorder. These genetic mutations are passed down either dominantly or recessively between generations. Thus, it is a rarely inherited disease; however, this emphasizes the importance of genetic testing and accurate diagnosis to assess the risk of developing IM.

Myofibromatosis refers to the formation and growth of rare tumors in various parts of the body, including the skin and bones. Tumors form through abnormal and excessive cell growth and division, which can lead to a variety of disorders and diseases, like myofibromatosis and cancer.

== Diagnosis ==
Diagnosis of diffuse infantile myofibromatosis requires microscopic tissue examination as well as a physical examination of the individual. Tumor growth is monitored using imaging software like ultrasound and MRI to visualize the tumor progression, regression, and can be useful in diagnosing recurrence of a tumor. The imaging software allows surgeons to pinpoint the location of the tumors and the extent of the lesions to properly evaluate the size.

In order to diagnose infantile myofibromatosis, a tissue sample must be removed from the tumor and be identified as infantile myofibromatosis as opposed to other growths that may look similar in imaging. In a case study in a 15-month-old diagnosed with diffuse infantile fibromatosis, the lesion tissue extracted from the infant's thigh had a salt-and-pepper appearance. By the looks of the tissue, there was swelling due to the increased presence of inflammatory cells, lymphoid follicles (dense tissue), increased capillaries, and some fat cells. Blood draws can be used to genetically test for and diagnose infantile myofibromatosis while also providing more details on potential causes (such as specific genes) and assessing the risk of infantile myofibromatosis in future pregnancies.

Genetic testing can identify the likelihood of getting the disease. It identifies if the individual is susceptible by screening for the PDGFRB and NOTCH3 gene, which are the causes of infantile fibromatosis. If a child is diagnosed with diffuse infantile fibromatosis, it is recommended for parents and siblings to be tested as well to calculated the risk of conceiving another child with the same gene.

== Prevention and screening ==
This disorder is not known to be preventable but screening for potential abnormalities at birth can help to identify tumor formation and monitor its severity.

As the disorder is known to be generational, prenatal screening ultrasounds can be conducted for families with at least one parent carrying a PDGFRB variant. Collecting a detailed family history and conducting physical examinations, ultrasounds, and genetic sequencing of the PDGFRB gene in tumors is also recommended following diagnosis.

== Treatment and management ==
Treatment for diffuse infantile fibromatosis is individualized and depends on the type of treatment that is most appropriate for the type, location, and size of the tumor. There are currently no guidelines for treatment due to how rare this disease is and treatment for individuals with the disease was decided on a case-by-case basis. Sometimes, these infantile lesions are untreated in hopes of a spontaneous remission, which means the lesion heals without any interventions or treatment.

While the tumor may grow slowly (or even shrink over time) and not require any intervention, surgery is the most direct treatment option to remove the tumor to prevent organ damage. As the tumor expands and grows bigger in size, it can lead to life-threatening complications and damage to organs, such as the bones, heart, and lungs.

In cases involving vital organs or progression towards vital organs, surgery is highly recommended to avoid further complications and improve the prognosis.

Another treatment option is chemotherapy; it is recommended when surgery is not an viable treatment option. However, in the study "Clinical utility of vinblastine therapeutic drug monitoring for the treatment of infantile myofibroma patients: A case series", the pharmacokinetic parameters of vinblastine (a chemotherapy medication) were studied among four infants with the age ranging between 3–3.5 weeks at the first dose of vinblastine. The study states that chemotherapy dose adjustment for infants is extremely difficult mainly due to the lack of age-specific pharmacokinetic data sets, and further study needs to be performed in order to establish an evidence-based dosing guidelines for infants.

Some affected children where surgery could not be performed for any reason or where progression was rapid were successfully treated with a combination of methotrexate and vinblastine.

== Outcomes and prognosis ==
There is a relatively good prognosis for solitary and multicentric myofibromatosis without visceral involvement. This is due to the spontaneous regression of tumors, which generally occurs within 18 to 24 months after diagnosis. In multicentric myofibromatosis with visceral involvement, multiple organs can be affected, resulting in a high rate of mortality for these individuals. Published cohorts of 28 to 31 children with multicentric myofibromatosis with visceral involvement reported mortality rates of 76–93%. The high rates were mostly attributed to cardiopulmonary and gastrointestinal complications.

== Epidemiology ==
This disorder affects less than 3,000 children in the United States. Infantile fibromatosis is found to affect 1 out of 150,000 babies, commonly under the age of 2 years; however, the statistics for diffused infantile fibromatosis are unknown due to the rare nature of the disease.

== History ==
Not much is known about the history and first discovery of infantile myofibromatosis; however, it is speculated to have been first identified by Williams and Schrum and Dr. A. P. Stout in 1954. The official name of infantile myofibromatosis was given in 1981 by Dr. Enzinger and Dr. Chung. Since then, a few case studies have been done by various researchers.

== Special populations ==
It is unclear what specific populations are affected by this disorder as it can be misdiagnosed pre-natal or at birth. Infantile myofibromatosis, however, is reported to affect males and females and has been known to affect a variety of ethnicities and geographical groups. Females are more likely to have multicentric forms of the disease that affect multiple internal organs and include several lesions in the skin, muscle, and bones.

== Research directions ==
Infantile myofibromatosis is an extremely rare disease; the majority of published literature is based on small cohorts or case reports. There is a need for systematic reviews to help physicians in clinical decision-making when treating IM. Because tumor regression is a common characteristic of IM, many physicians take the 'wait and see' approach before actively treating IM with chemotherapy. This method comes into question when IM infiltrates organ systems, becoming life-threatening. Treatment with chemotherapy has shown to be effective in promoting tumor regression, but it comes with a risk of toxicities. Treatment with a tyrosine kinase inhibitor (TKI) may be a possibility in individuals with the p.Arg561Cys mutation which results from a point mutation on the PDGFRB gene. TKIs such as imatinib pose less potential toxicities than chemotherapy treatment, but there is still a possibility of stunted growth. Therefore, a systematic review focusing on prevalence of germline and somatic mutation of the PDGFRB gene may be helpful in evaluating how genetics play a role in disease severity and response to variable therapies. Additionally, there is a lack of knowledge as to how to predict tumor recurrence in adolescence and adulthood. A small number of individuals have shown tumor recurrence in times of hormonal changes such as during puberty and pregnancy.

Furthermore, case reports have suggested improvement for imaging and diagnosis, especially considering that mass sizes are critical for accurate MRI detection of tumors. Lack of accuracy and depth of imaging has led to poor prognosis of this disease.

== See also ==
- Skin lesion
