= Piezogenic papules =

- Other names: Painful fat herniation, piezogenic pedal papules
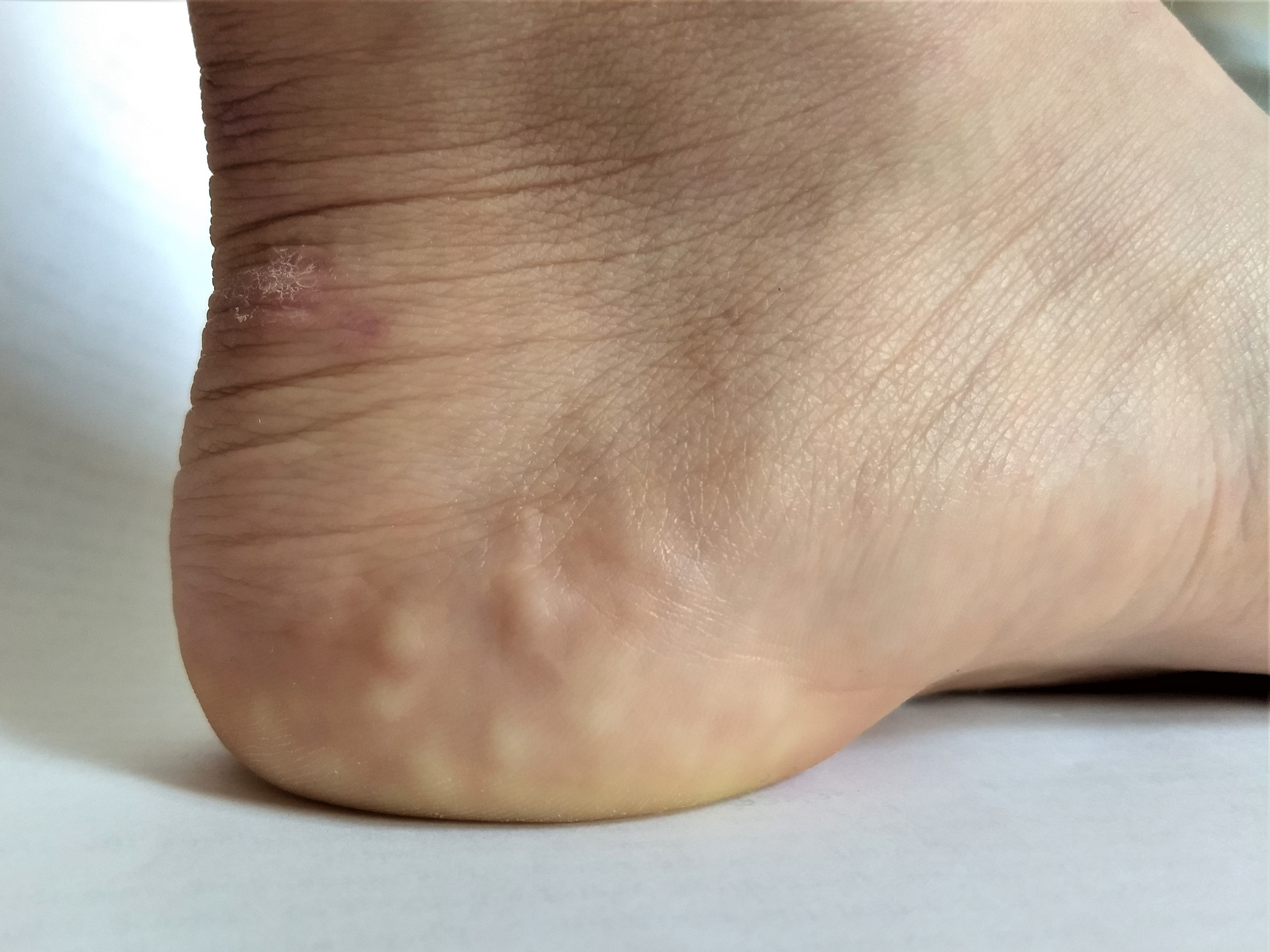
- Piezogenic papules on the heel of an individual with Ehlers–Danlos syndrome.
- Specialty: Dermatology
- Symptoms: Multiple yellowish to skin-coloured small or large bumps, mostly painless; typically on heels and wrist
- Causes: Pressure
- Risk factors: Obesity, flat feet, athletes, figure skaters, long-distance runners
- Diagnostic method: Appearance
- Differential diagnosis: Juvenile aponeurotic fibroma
- Treatment: None
- Frequency: Common

Piezogenic papules are protrusions of fat that form within the subcutaneous tissue of the skin. They are typically found on the heels or wrists.

== Signs and symptoms ==
They present as multiple small or large bumps characteristically on the heels and wrists. Most are asymptomatic and pain is rare, although some may present with pain before the bumps are noticed. They generally occur bilaterally and display a yellowish to skin-color. They may feel soft or firm.

== Cause and risks ==
The bumps are caused by pressure. There may be an association with Prader–Willi syndrome, and around a third of individuals with Ehlers–Danlos syndrome may have them. Risk factors include obesity, flat feet, athletics, figure skating, and long-distance running.

== Diagnosis and treatment ==
Diagnosis is based on appearance. If present in a child it may appear similar to juvenile aponeurotic fibroma.

Generally, no treatment is required. They usually disappear when pressure is relieved; avoidance of prolonged standing, taping foot, compression stockings, heel cups, padding devices.

== Epidemiology ==
Piezogenic papules are relatively common; in one small population-based study, the prevalence was found to be 76%. The same study found that it was not unusual to demonstrate the bumps when pressing a person's wrist.

== History ==
The term was coined by Walter Brown Shelley and Rawnsley, who first described piezogenic papules in 1968.

== See also ==
- List of cutaneous conditions
