= Metacarpal ligaments =

Metacarpal ligaments may refer to:

- Deep transverse metacarpal ligament
- Superficial transverse metacarpal ligament
