= Collagenase clostridium histolyticum =

Pharmaceutical drug

Clinical data
- Trade names: Xiaflex, Xiapex, Qwo
- Other names: AA-4500, collagenase clostridium histolyticum-aaes
- AHFS/Drugs.com: Monograph
- MedlinePlus: a612029
- License data: EU EMA: by Collagenase clostridium histolyticum; US DailyMed: Collagenase_clostridium_histolyticum
- Routes of administration: Intralesional injection
- ATC code: M09AB02 (WHO)

Legal status
- Legal status: US: ℞-only; In general: ℞ (Prescription only)

Identifiers
- CAS Number: 9001-12-1
- PubChem SID: 138909
- DrugBank: DB00048
- ChemSpider: none
- UNII: 9X7O8V25IT
- KEGG: C00816
- CompTox Dashboard (EPA): DTXSID401010862
- ECHA InfoCard: 100.029.608

Chemical and physical data
- Molar mass: 114 kg/mol (AUX-I); 113 kg/mol (AUX-II)

Collagenase clostridium histolyticum is an enzyme produced by the bacterium Clostridium histolyticum that dismantles collagen. It is used as a powder-and-solvent injection kit for the treatment of Dupuytren's contracture, a condition where the fingers bend towards the palm and cannot be fully straightened, and Peyronie's disease, a connective tissue disorder involving the growth of fibrous plaques in the soft tissue of the penis. BioSpecifics Technologies developed the preparation, which is manufactured and marketed by Endo Pharmaceuticals as Xiaflex in the US and by Sobi as Xiapex in Europe.

Biochemically, it is a mixture of two C. histolyticum collagenases, ColH and ColG. A similar ointment preparation called Santyl contains one or many collagenases from the same bacterium, but it is unclear which.

== Uses ==
In February 2010, the Food and Drug Administration of the United States approved Xiaflex for the treatment of Dupuytren's contracture. It is the first approved nonsurgical treatment for this condition. In a case of Dupuytren's contracture, collagen accumulates in the palmar fascia of the hands, so that the fingers cannot be straightened. A similar phenomenon occurs in Peyronie's disease, a contracture of the penis.

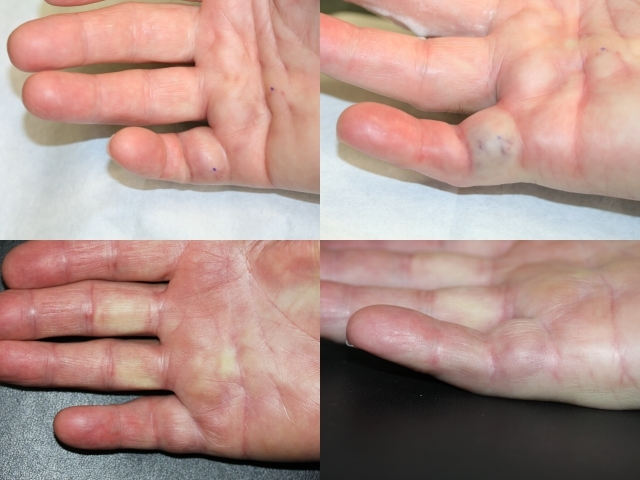
Collagenase clostridium histolyticum injection for Dupuytren's contracture. Before, next day, and two weeks after first treatment

In February 2011, the European Commission's Committee for Medicinal Products for Human Use approved the product for the treatment of Dupuytren's contracture in adults with a palpable cord by 'properly trained' doctors. Pfizer was reported to be working with Europe's national medicines regulatory bodies to launch the new treatment, hoping doctors could prescribe the treatment by late 2011.

On November 7, 2012, BioSpecifics announced "BioSpecifics Technologies Corp. : Reports Third Quarter 2012 Financial Results". Auxilium's submission of a License Application to the FDA for Xiaflex for the potential treatment of Peyronie's disease, an excess of inelastic collagen causing penile curvature deformity. The FDA approved Xiaflex for the treatment of Peyronie’s disease in December 2013. Following this, Xiapex gained EU approval for the treatment of Peyronie’s disease in February 2015, making it the first and only biologic therapy indicated for the treatment of Peyronie's disease. Auxilium has also reported additional trials for potential use of Xiaflex are underway for the treatment of frozen shoulder, cellulite reductions and both human and canine lipomas.

In March 2020, the Swedish manufacturer abruptly withdrew distribution of this drug in Europe for commercial reasons. Collagenase is no longer available on the National Health System except as part of a small clinical trial.

== Side effects ==
The most common side effects include lymphadenopathy (swollen lymph nodes), itching, pain, oedema, and bleeding (for example in the form of bruises or ecchymoses). Allergic reactions are seen in less than 1% of patients.

In Peyronie's disease, potential side effects include corporal rupture (penile fracture) or other serious penile injury.

== Chemical properties ==
The substance is a constant mixture of two collagenases (AUX-I and AUX-II) with known amino acid sequences and a length of about 1000 amino acids each. It is prepared by anaerobic fermentation from a strain of C. histolyticum that has been known since 1950.

== Pharmacology ==
The enzymes do not reach the bloodstream in significant amounts and are presumed to largely stay at the point of injection until they are broken down by proteases.

The two collagenases act synergistically by cleaving tropocollagen (the 'collagen molecule') at different points. AUX-I attacks the C- and N-termini, AUX-II cleaves amino acid bonds within the molecule. Small collagen fragments are broken down by both enzymes.

== Interactions ==
No interaction studies have been conducted because the drug does not reach the bloodstream and the liver. It is theorised that drugs interfering with matrix metalloproteinases, such as tetracyclines, anthracyclines, quinolones, and anthraquinone derivatives, could reduce the efficacy of the collagenases, but no clinical evidence for such an interaction has been observed.
