= Nuchal fibroma =

- Specialty: Oncology

Nuchal-type fibroma is a rare benign proliferation involving the dermis and subcutaneous tissues, that is a collection of dense, hypocellular bundles of collagen with entrapped adipocytes and increased numbers of small nerves. It is no longer called a nuchal fibroma, but instead a "nuchal-type fibroma" since it develops in other anatomic sites. There is no known etiology. The World Health Organization in 2020 classified nuchal fibromas as a specific tumor form in the category of benign fibroblastic and myofibroblastic tumors.

== Signs and symptoms ==
These lesions are generally asymptomatic, although patients give a long history of a solitary, superficial mass. The mass is usually in the neck (hence the name "nuchal-type"), but it can be seen in the extremities, lumbosacral area, buttocks, and face. There is a strong association with diabetes mellitus and Gardner syndrome; in fact, it may be the initial manifestation of Gardner syndrome.

== Pathology ==
A low power of a nuchal-type fibroma showing entrapped fat.

The tumors are unencapsulated and poorly circumscribed, showing a firm, white cut surface. Most tumors are about 3.5 cm, but can be up to 8 cm. By microscopic examination, there are haphazardly arranged thick collagen fibers, with a low cellularity and no pleomorphism. There are usually entrapped fat cells, skeletal muscle, and peripheral nerves. The may be perineural fibrosis. The elastic fibers may be altered, which is why an elastofibroma is considered in the differential diagnosis.

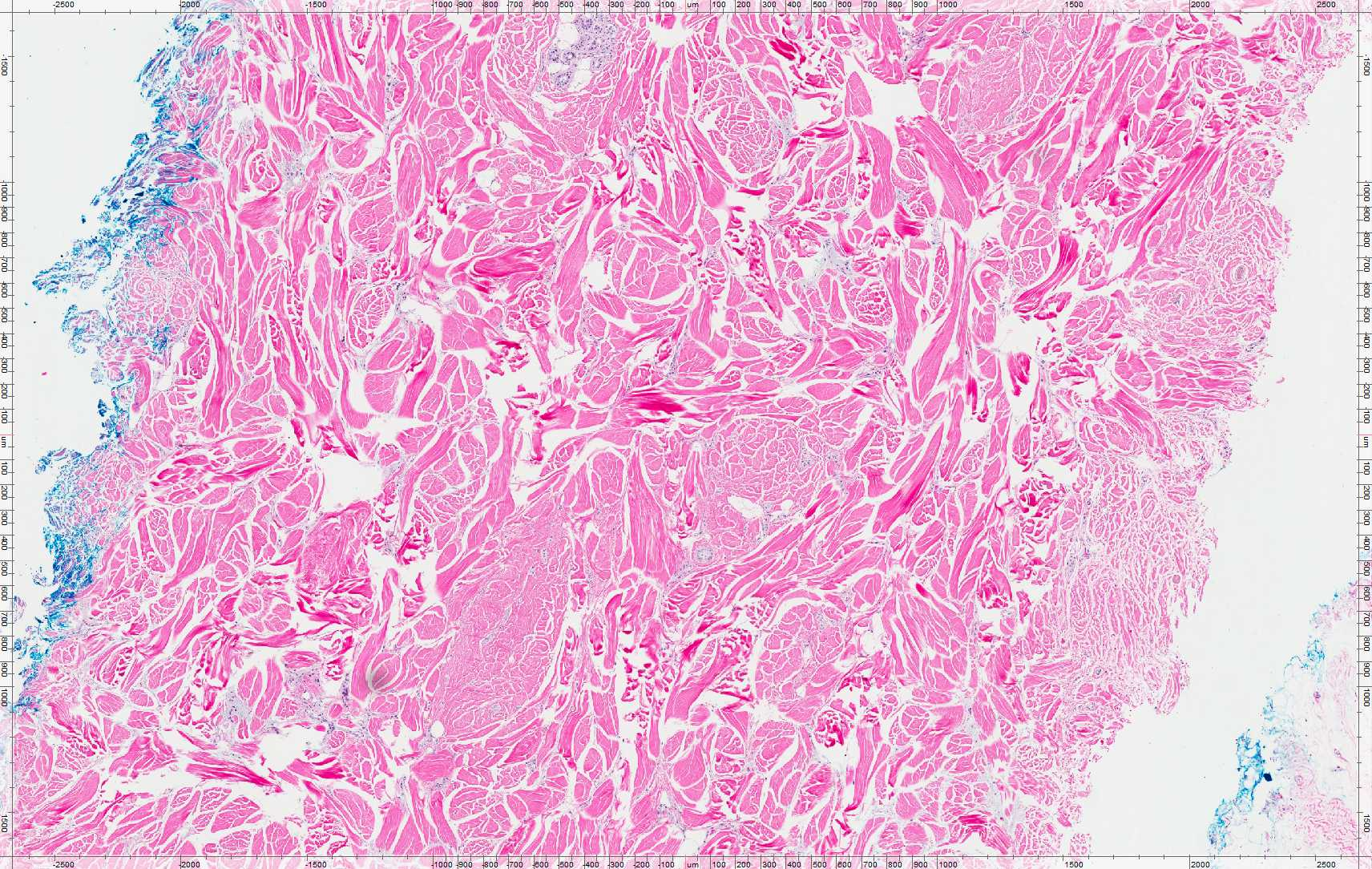
Nuchal fibroma

=== Immunohistochemistry ===
The tumor cells are strongly positive for vimentin, CD34, and sometimes with CD99. There is often (up to 2/3rds) a nuclear reaction with β-catenin.

== Diagnosis ==
=== Differential diagnoses ===
The differential diagnosis includes elastofibroma, fibrolipoma, desmoid-type fibromatoses, and nuchal fibrocartilaginous pseudotumor.

== Management ==
Simple excision is curative. However, in patients with Gardner syndrome, up to 45% will develop desmoid-type fibromatosis at other sites, and so this should be searched for and excluded. Patients can develop a recurrence, so follow-up is required.

== Epidemiology ==
This is a rare tumor, presenting over a wide age range, but usually in the third to fifth decades of life. There is a slight male predilection, although this is not seen in syndrome-associated patients. The most common site is the posterior neck, but may also be seen in other sites (extremities, lumbosacral area, buttocks, face).

== See also ==
Fibrous lesions
