= Atrophia maculosa varioliformis cutis =

- Specialty: Dermatology

Atrophia Maculosa Varioliformis Cutis (AMVC) is an idiopathic noninflammatory macular atrophy subtype that affects young people. Clinically, it is distinguished by a variety of shaped, shallow, sharply demaracated depressions.

== Signs and symptoms ==
The clinical feature of AMVC is the spontaneous onset of atrophic lesions that are usually on the face of adolescents. These lesions can be round, oval, linear, curvilinear, or rectangular with a regular margin and clearly defined edges. The sites most commonly affected are the bilateral malar regions. However the mandibular region and forehead may also be impacted. The absence of prior inflammatory or traumatic events at the lesion site is characteristic of this condition. There have been reports of extrafacial involvement, such as lesions on the forearm, posterior aspect of the pinna, and periumbilical area. The lesion may range in size from 0.2-2 cm in length and 0.2-0.5 cm in width; neither exfoliation nor pigmentary changes may be present. They are cicatricial and depressed in comparison to the surrounding skin.

== Causes ==
Although the exact cause of AMVC is unknown, a familial occurrence that has been documented in the past raises the possibility that the condition is inherited rather than the result of an environmental insult. There have been reports of cases linked to pachydermodactyly and extrahepatic biliary atresia, although these links might be accidental.

== Diagnosis ==
Patients with facial atrophic lesions with well-defined edges and no erythema, induration, pigmentary changes, or honeycombed pattern are typically diagnosed with AMVC primarily based on clinical findings. With a comparatively normal dermis, a small reduction in or fragmentation of the elastic fibers, no fibrosis, and little to no inflammation beneath the shallow depression of the epidermis, the histological features are nonspecific.
