= Clostridial aminopeptidase =

Class of enzymes

Identifiers
- EC no.: 3.4.11.13
- CAS no.: 59680-69-2

Databases
- IntEnz: IntEnz view
- BRENDA: BRENDA entry
- ExPASy: NiceZyme view
- KEGG: KEGG entry
- MetaCyc: metabolic pathway
- PRIAM: profile
- PDB structures: RCSB PDB PDBe PDBsum
Search
- PMC: articles
- PubMed: articles
- NCBI: proteins

Clostridial aminopeptidase (EC 3.4.11.13, Clostridium histolyticum aminopeptidase) is an enzyme. This enzyme catalyses the following chemical reaction

Release of any N-terminal amino acid, including proline and hydroxyproline, but no cleavage of Xaa-Pro-

This enzyme is secreted enzyme from Clostridium histolyticum. It requiring Mn^{2+} or Co^{2+}.
