= Transverse metacarpal ligament =

Transverse metacarpal ligament may refer to:

- Deep transverse metacarpal ligament, tissue connecting finger joints
- Superficial transverse metacarpal ligament, tissue in the palm of the hand
