= Misha Dichter =

American classical pianist

Misha Dichter (born September 27, 1945) is an American pianist.

== Biography ==
Misha Dichter was born in Shanghai to Polish-Jewish parents who fled during WWII. He moved with his family to Los Angeles, California, at the age of two and began studying piano at the age of five. He studied with Aube Tzerko, a pupil of Artur Schnabel, who established a concentrated practice regimen and intensive approach to musical analysis. Dichter also studied composition and analysis with Leonard Stein, a disciple of Arnold Schoenberg. He attended the Juilliard School in New York and studied with Rosina Lhévinne.

While enrolled at the Juilliard School, Dichter won the Silver medal at the 1966 International Tchaikovsky Competition in Moscow, an accomplishment which helped launch his international musical career. Shortly after, he performed Tchaikovsky's Piano Concerto No. 1 at Tanglewood with the Boston Symphony Orchestra, conducted by Erich Leinsdorf, nationally broadcast live on NBC and subsequently recorded for RCA. Dichter made his debut with Leonard Bernstein and the New York Philharmonic in 1968 performing the same concerto. Appearances with the Berlin Philharmonic, Concertgebouw of Amsterdam, the principal London orchestras, and major American orchestras soon followed.

Dichter has contributed articles to leading publications including the New York Times. He has been seen frequently on national television, was the subject of an hour-long European television documentary, and was featured with his dog Thunder in the film My Dog: An Unconventional Love Story.

Dichter has needed to have multiple surgeries on his hands to allow him to continue playing, due to a condition called Dupuytren's contracture.

== Recordings ==
Misha Dichter's acclaimed recordings for Philips, RCA, MusicMasters, and Koch Classics illustrate the scope of his musical interests. They include the Brahms piano concertos with Kurt Masur and the Leipzig Gewandhaus Orchestra, Brahms solo works including the Handel Variations, Beethoven piano sonatas, the complete Franz Liszt Hungarian Rhapsodies, the Liszt piano concertos with André Previn and the Pittsburgh Symphony, and Gershwin's Rhapsody in Blue with Neville Marriner and the Philharmonia Orchestra, as well as music of Chopin, Mussorgsky, Schubert, Schumann, Stravinsky and Tchaikovsky.

Many of Dichter's recordings have also been reissued; his recording of Beethoven's Pathetique Sonata and Brahms's Piano Concerto No. 2, Op. 83 with the Leipzig Gewandhaus Orchestra conducted by Kurt Masur, and his recording of Beethoven's "Moonlight" Sonata and Brahms's First Piano Concerto, also with Kurt Masur and the Leipzig Gewandhaus Orchestra were released on SACD by Pentatone. His recording of Liszt's Hungarian Rhapsodies has been reissued on the Newton label.

== Awards ==
Misha Dichter was honored in 1998 with the "Grand Prix International Du Disque Liszt" for his recording of Liszt's piano transcriptions released on the Phillips label.

He was inducted as a National Patron of Delta Omicron, an international professional music fraternity on April 13, 1999.

== Cipa Glazman Dichter ==
At Juilliard, he met his future wife, Cipa Glazman. She was born in Brazil of Polish-Russian parents and had her first piano lessons at the age of six. She made her professional debut at 16 with the Symphony Orchestra of Brazil and came to the United States to study at Juilliard shortly thereafter. Together, Misha and Cipa Dichter are an accomplished piano duo. They have performed throughout North America, Europe, and at summer festivals in the U.S. such as Ravinia, Caramoor, Lincoln Center's Mostly Mozart, and the Aspen Music Festival. The Dichters have performed many previously neglected two-piano and piano-four-hand works. They recorded Mozart's complete piano works for four hands, which was released in a 3-CD set by Nimbus records.

The Dichters live in New York City.
