= Hathewaya histolytica =

Scientific classification
- Domain: Bacteria
- Kingdom: Bacillati
- Phylum: Bacillota
- Class: Clostridia
- Order: Eubacteriales
- Family: Clostridiaceae
- Genus: Hathewaya
- Species: H. histolytica

Binomial name
- Hathewaya histolytica (Weinberg and Séguin 1916) Lawson and Rainey 2016

Synonyms
- Bacillus histolyticus; Clostridium histolyticum (Weinberg and Séguin 1916) Bergey, Harrison, Breed, Hammer, and Huntoon 1923; Weinbergillus histolyticus

Species of bacterium

Hathewaya histolytica (formerly Clostridium histolyticum) is a species of bacteria found in feces and the soil. It is a motile, gram-positive, aerotolerant anaerobe. H. histolytica is pathogenic in many species, including guinea pigs, mice, and rabbits, and humans. H. histolytica has been shown to cause gas gangrene, often in association with other bacteria species.

== History ==
In 1916, Michel Weinberg and Pierre Séguin isolated this bacterium from patients with gas gangrene and called it Bacillus histolyticus. They discovered this bacterium was pathogenic for guinea pigs, mice, and rabbits, but less so for rats. Intramuscular injection of culture caused extensive local tissue destruction, extrusion of a hemorrhagic muscle pulp, splitting of the skin, denudation of the bone, and sometimes autoamputation. In 1922, Heller renamed the bacterium Weinbergillus histolyticus, and a year later Bergey, Harrison, et al. reclassified it as Clostridium histolyticum.In 2016, Lawson and Rainey recombined it as Hathewaya histolytica.

== Microbiology ==
Hathewaya histolytica can be isolated from soil during the early stage of soil cultivation, by heating the sample at 60 °C for 30 minutes. H. histolytica can be plated on Zeissler plate agar, and appear as dewlike colonies of either rough or smooth morphology, surrounded by a zone of weak hemolysis. On blood agar, colonies appear small, rough, irregularly round, and are surrounded by a zone of weak hemolysis. These bacteria tend to clump in pairs or short chains and are rods of 3-5μm x 0.5-0.7μm. Cells are richly flagellate and very motile. Hathewaya histolytica produces large endospores and are asaccharolytic and proteolytic. This bacterium is anaerobic, however minimal growth may be obtained through aerobic culture.

Hathewaya histolytica is difficult to culture because growth is inhibited by sugars, and spores are not very heat resistant. In wound smears, Hathewaya histolytica closely resembles the comparable Clostridium perfringens, but without the capsule of C. perfringens. This may interfere with diagnosis of H. histolytica infection.

== Toxigenicity ==
Studies have shown that the toxigenicity of a strain of Hathewaya histolytica is directly related to its sporulating potency: the higher the sporulating potency, the more toxigenic the strain. Additionally, toxigenic strains possess a stronger potential for growth than less toxigenic or nontoxigenic strains. Smooth substrains of H. histolytica seem to show higher toxigenicity than rough substrains.

== Toxins of Hathewaya histolytica ==
Hathewaya histolytica produces five toxins: alpha, beta, gamma, delta, and epsilon.

=== Alpha-toxin ===
The alpha-toxin is the major toxigenic factor of H. histolytica. When injected into muscle, it can cause death in laboratory animals within hours. Alpha-toxin is a necrotizing, but not hemolytic, toxin. This toxin is secreted, as it is isolated from filtrates of H. histolytica cultures. It is neutralized by antisera produced against toxic filtrates of C. septicum cultures through cross-neutralization. Additionally, alpha-toxin is readily inactivated by proteolytic enzymes. It has been shown that only about 29% of H. histolytica strains isolated from soil actually produce this alpha-toxin.

=== Beta-toxin ===
The beta-toxin of H. histolytica is a group of seven collagenases. Collagenases are zinc metalloproteases that cleave collagen and gelatin into small fragments. The seven collagenases are alpha, beta, gamma, delta, epsilon, zeta, and eta. They are further identified by their molecular masses (68, 115,79, 100, 110, 125, and 130 kDa, respectively) to distinguish them from the five toxins. Beta-toxin plays a major role in the pathogenicity of H. histolytica, due to its ability to destroy collagen fibers in the body and cause necrosis. Beta-toxin has been shown to induce hemorrhage when placed on the surface of lungs of animals, hemorrhage and edema when injected into rat paws, and lethal intrapulmonary hemorrhage when injected intravenously into animals.

=== Gamma-toxin ===
Gamma-toxin is a cysteine-activated proteinase that digests hide powder, gelatin, and casein. It is not active against collagen. The molecular weight of gamma-toxin is 50,000 Da.

=== Delta-toxin ===
Delta- toxin is an elastase activated by Ca2+ ions. This proteolytic enzyme is inhibited by cysteine and reversibly inactivated by reducing agents. The molecular weight is between 10 and 50 kDa.

=== Epsilon-toxin ===
Epsilon-toxin is an oxygen-labile hemolysin similar to the θ-toxin of C. perfringens and the δ-toxins of C. septicum, and C. novyi.

== Proteinases ==
Toxigenic strains of Hathewaya histolytica secrete proteinases and collagenases that can degrade and necrotize organs and muscles in the human body. H. histolytica proteinases, including gamma- and delta-toxin, digest native and denatured proteins to amino acids with the production of ammonia. They can also clot milk and later digest the clot, and hemolyze sheep blood. The proteinases are capable of digesting burn eschars, and may be useful for removal of burn tissue from wounds. By themselves, the H. histolytica proteinases gamma-toxin and delta-toxin are not active in the human body. It seems they only attack collagenous material already partially degraded by the beta-toxin, and aid in the nutrition of H. histolytica.

Hathewaya histolytica proteinases are unique in their efficiency of converting tissue proteins to amino acids and peptides. Further, these enzymes are unique in that they do not produce isoacids (isobutyric acid and isocaproic acid) as metabolic end products.

== Collagenase ==
Collagenase clostridium histolyticum is secreted by the bacterium and can destroy connective tissue of muscles. This collagenase has been used to treat Dupuytren's contracture, a disease of pathological collagen production and deposition in the hands. This disease causes flexion contractures of the joints, severely limiting hand function, most often in the ring and little fingers. Studies have shown that injection of collagenase clostridium histolyticum significantly reduces the contractures by lysing the collagen and disrupting the contracted cords. This treatment has restored contractured fingers to full extension 30 days after the last injection in 64% of joints injected with collagenase costridium histolyticum. Side effects are mild, and this treatment is preferred to surgical options because no extensive hand therapy is required post-treatment. Collagenase clostridium histolyticum is manufactured and marketed by Endo Pharmaceuticals in the US, and marketed by SOBI in the EU Auxilium / SOBI agreement, and by Actelion in Canada and Australia Auxilium / Actelion agreement.

== Role in disease ==
Hathewaya histolytica secretes potent exotoxins that have proteolytic and necrotizing properties, causing severe local necrosis. However, there have been few cases of human infection by this species. From 1984 to 2004, only one case of H. histolytica necrotizing infection was reported, in an agricultural worker with a crushed-hand injury.

In 2000, an 18-year-old female drug user in Turkey was diagnosed with infective endocarditis caused by H. histolytica. This was the first documented case where this bacterium has been identified as the cause of infective endocarditis. All diagnostic tests in this case were negative or normal until an anaerobic blood culture identified H. histolytica as the infectious agent isolated from the heart valve tissue.

A 2002 study of the intestinal flora of inflammatory bowel disease (IBD) researchers found that in patients who had ulcerative colitis, a form of IBD, 21% of the total bacteria in the colon were Hathewaya histolytica. Control specimen did not contain this species at all. In healthy adults, the amount of clostridia species in the feces is rarely higher than 106 cells/g feces, less than 1% of the total flora. This suggests that C. histolyticum may play a role in the pathogenesis of ulcerative colitis as putative pathogens.

In 2004, there was an outbreak of H. histolytica infections in necrotic lesions in 11 injecting drug users in England and Scotland. All patients were heroin users, and had injected the drug into the muscle rather than a vein. It was thought that H. histolytica spores had contaminated a batch of heroin early in production, and survived the production process before being distributed across the United Kingdom.

=== Diagnosis and treatment of infection ===
Hathewaya histolytica can cause gas gangrene, an acute infection of pain, fever, myonecrosis, and massive edema. If not controlled, the infection can result in systemic toxemia, multiorgan failure, and even death. Further, this infection can progress to life-threatening in a matter of hours.

While gas gangrene is easily diagnosed by the visible necrosis and characteristic smell, identifying Hathewaya histolytica as the causative agent is more difficult. With the exception of protein tests, all commonly used culture tests are negative. There is little or no gas production, and this bacterium is negative for lecithinase and lipase reactions. Anaerobic blood cultures are necessary for identification of H. histolytica infection.

For most infections, clindamycin and penicillin treatment is recommended. Further, a cocktail of antimicrobials targeting aerobic and anaerobic gram-positive and gram-negative bacteria may be used in necrotizing infections caused by multiple species, including H. histolytica. H. histolytica is also susceptible to metronidazole and imipenem. However, advanced gas gangrene infections caused by H. histolytica may only be treatable through amputation of the infected limb.

== See also ==
- Collagenase clostridium histolyticum
- Gas gangrene
- Dupuytren's contracture
- Infective endocarditis
- Ulcerative colitis
