= Pachydermodactyly =

- Specialty: Dermatology

Pachydermodactyly is a superficial dermal fibromatosis that presents as a poorly circumscribed symmetric, infiltrative, asymptomatic soft-tissue hypertrophy of the proximal fingers, typically sparing the thumbs and fifth fingers and rarely extending proximally to the wrists or occurring distally.

== Signs and symptoms ==
Pachydermodactyly is defined by gradual, asymptomatic thickening of the periarticular skin and soft tissue swelling, mainly affecting the lateral sides of the fingers' proximal interphalangeal (PIP) joints. The most commonly affected fingers are the second, third, and fourth; however, the dorsum of the hand and the fifth finger may also be affected. Although moderate erythema, fine desquamation, or lichenification may occasionally be seen, epidermal alterations are not typically present. There is no impact on hand movements.

== Causes ==
Although the specific cause and etiology are yet unknown, excessive mechanical manipulation of PIP joints is likely to be a contributing factor. The basis for this suggestion is the discovery that pachydermodactyly is related to a variety of jobs and pursuits, including weightlifting, employment in food processing facilities, martial arts, climbing, and individuals with OCD who have hand tics.

== Diagnosis ==
The final diagnosis is clinical and made after ruling out other possible causes of joint swelling. It calls for a high degree of suspicion, especially in individuals who have progressive soft tissue swelling without any pain, soreness, or diminished function. Unless clinically indicated, laboratory testing such as extractable nuclear antigen test, rheumatoid factor, C-reactive protein, complete blood count, and antinuclear factor are not required.

A thickening of the dermis, possibly associated with a benign proliferation of fibroblasts, and an increase in collagen fibers that extend to the subcutaneous cellular tissue are the most common histological findings. In addition, there may be a decrease in mucin and elastic fibers, as well as hyperkeratosis (orthokeratosis or parakeratosis).

Hand radiographs usually show soft tissue swelling without interphalangeal joint structural involvement. An X-ray examination shows no abnormalities in the periosteum or bones in pachydermodactyly patients. Additionally, no changes are seen in the synovium or joints during ultrasound.

Chen et al. published a diagnostic criterion that consists of six elements: the patient having no symptoms; there being no stiffness in the morning; no restriction on movement; swelling on the lateral aspect of the finger; normal laboratory values; and soft tissue swelling on radiography.

Differential diagnoses include rheumatoid arthritis, acromegaly, juvenile idiopathic arthritis, pachydermoperiostosis, knuckle pads, and juvenile digital fibromatosis.

== Treatment ==
Pachydermodactyly does not currently have a commonly accepted treatment. Nevertheless, aggressive therapy is usually not necessary due to the disease's benign course. Since the majority of pachydermodactyly cases appear with symptoms caused by recurrent joint trauma, discontinuing stimulating activities is sufficient to promote regression or stabilization. It has also been demonstrated that intralesional corticosteroids can sometimes reduce swelling. Intralesional triamcinolone injections have also been reported to alleviate symptoms. Pachydermodactyly patients frequently have surgery to improve the appearance of a digit.

== See also ==
- Skin lesion
