= Plantar fibromatosis =

Thickening of the feet's deep connective tissue (fascia)

- Other names: Ledderhose's disease
- This condition is inherited in an autosomal dominant manner
- Specialty: Rheumatology

Plantar fascial fibromatosis, also known as Ledderhose's disease, Morbus Ledderhose, and plantar fibromatosis, is a relatively uncommon non-malignant thickening of the feet's deep connective tissue, or fascia. In the beginning, where nodules start growing in the fascia of the foot, the disease is minor. Over time, walking becomes painful. The disease is named after Georg Ledderhose, a German surgeon who described the condition for the first time in 1894. A similar disease is Dupuytren's disease, which affects the hand and causes bent hand or fingers.

As in most forms of fibromatosis, it is usually benign and its onset varies with each patient. The nodules are typically slow-growing and most often found in the central and medial portions of the plantar fascia. Occasionally, the nodules may lie dormant for months to years only to begin rapid and unexpected growth. Options for intervention include radiation therapy, cryosurgery, treatment with collagenase clostridium histolyticum, or surgical removal only if discomfort hinders walking.

In 2020, the World Health Organization reclassified plantar fibromatosis as a specific type of tumor in the category of intermediate (locally aggressive) fibroblastic and myofibroblastic tumors.

== Signs and symptoms ==
Plantar fibromatosis is most frequently present on the medial border of the sole, near the highest point of the arch. The lump is usually painless and the only pain experienced is when the nodule rubs on the shoe or floor. The overlying skin is freely movable, and contracture of the toes does not occur in the initial stages.

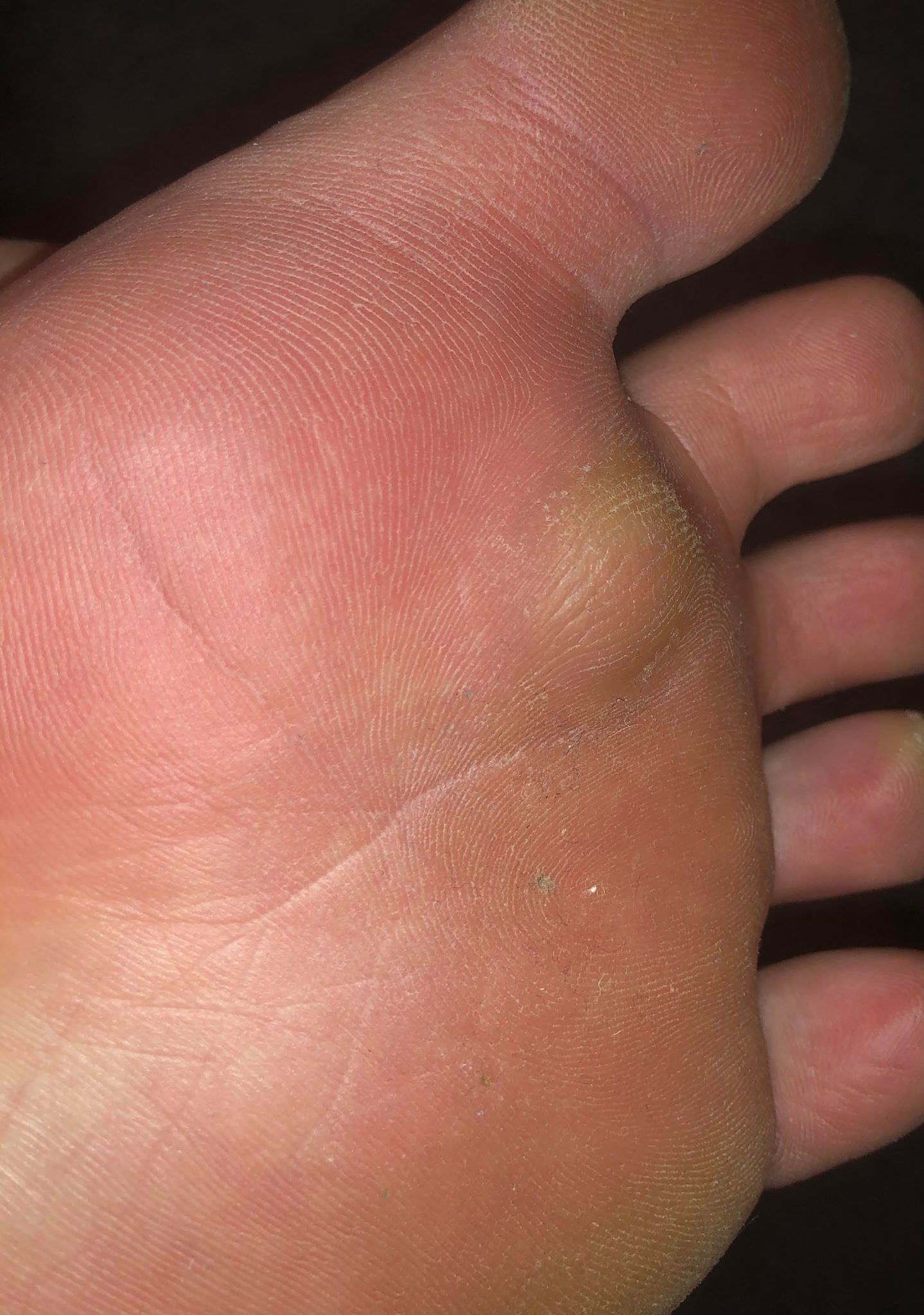
A plantar fibroma right below the 2nd toe.

The typical appearance of plantar fibromatosis on magnetic resonance imaging (MRI) is a poorly defined, infiltrative mass in the aponeurosis next to the plantar muscles.

Only 25% of patients show symptoms on both feet (bilateral involvement). The disease may also infiltrate the dermis or, very rarely, the flexor tendon sheath.

== Risk factors ==
The histological and ultrastructural features of Ledderhose and Dupuytren's disease are the same, which supports the hypothesis that they have a common cause and pathogenesis. As with Dupuytren's disease, the root cause(s) of Ledderhose's disease are not yet understood. It has been noted that it is an inherited disease and of variable occurrence within families, i.e. the genes necessary for it may remain dormant for a generation or more and then surface in an individual, or be present in multiple individuals in the same generation with varying degree.

There are certain identified risk factors. The disease is more commonly associated with:

- A family history of the disease
- Higher incidence in males
- Palmar fibromatosis 10–65% of the time.
- Peyronie's disease
- Epilepsy patients
- Diabetes mellitus

There is also a suspected, although unproven, link between incidence and alcoholism, smoking, liver diseases, thyroid problems, and stressful work involving the feet.

== Diagnosis ==
A combination of physical examination of the arch and plantar fascia, as well as ultrasound imaging by a physician is the usual path to diagnosis.

An MRI (Magnetic Resonance Imaging) scan is usually the imaging of choice to determine between other possible conditions such as ganglion cysts. MRI tends to be more accurate than x-ray or ultrasound, showing the full extent of the condition.

== Treatment ==
Although the origin of the disease is unknown, there is speculation that it is an aggressive healing response to small tears in the plantar fascia, almost as if the fascia over-repairs itself following an injury. There is also some evidence that it might be genetic.

In the early stages, when the nodule is single and/or smaller, it is recommended to avoid direct pressure to the nodule(s). Soft inner soles on footwear and padding may be helpful.

MRI and sonogram (diagnostic ultrasound) are effective in showing the extent of the lesion, but cannot reveal the tissue composition. Even then, recognition of the imaging characteristics of plantar fibromatoses can help in the clinical diagnosis.

Surgery of Ledderhose's disease is difficult because tendons, nerves, and muscles are located very closely to each other. Additionally, feet have to carry heavy load, and surgery might have unpleasant side effects. If surgery is performed, the biopsy is predominantly cellular and frequently misdiagnosed as fibrosarcoma. Since the diseased area (lesion) is not encapsulated, clinical margins are difficult to define. As such, portions of the diseased tissue may be left in the foot after surgery. Inadequate excision is the leading cause of recurrence.

Radiotherapy has been shown to reduce the size of the nodules and reduce the pain associated with them. It is approximately 80% effective, with minimal side effects.

Post-surgical radiation treatment may decrease recurrence. There has also been variable success in preventing recurrence by administering gadolinium. Skin grafts have been shown to control the recurrence of the disease.

Extracorporeal shock wave therapy (ESWT) has, in some cases, been reported to significantly reduce pain and improve walking ability in patients with plantar fibromatosis. Collagenase injection, FDA-approved for Dupuytren's contracture with favorable outcomes, showed no benefit in a reported case of plantar fibromatosis. Cryotherapy has also been reported as an effective treatment for Ledderhose disease, with an approximate 80% success rate and potentially lower recurrence than conventional surgery.

Cortisone injections, such as triamcinolone, and clobetasol ointments have been shown to stall the progression of the disease temporarily, although the results are subjective and large-scale studies far from complete. Injections of superoxide dismutase have proven to be unsuccessful in curing the disease while radiotherapy has been used successfully on early-stage Ledderhose nodules.

Topical verapamil is also used to treat plantar fibromatosis.

== See also ==
- Fibromatosis
- Dupuytren's contracture
- Plantar fasciitis
- List of cutaneous conditions
