= Fibromatosis =

Benign tumor originating in connective tissue

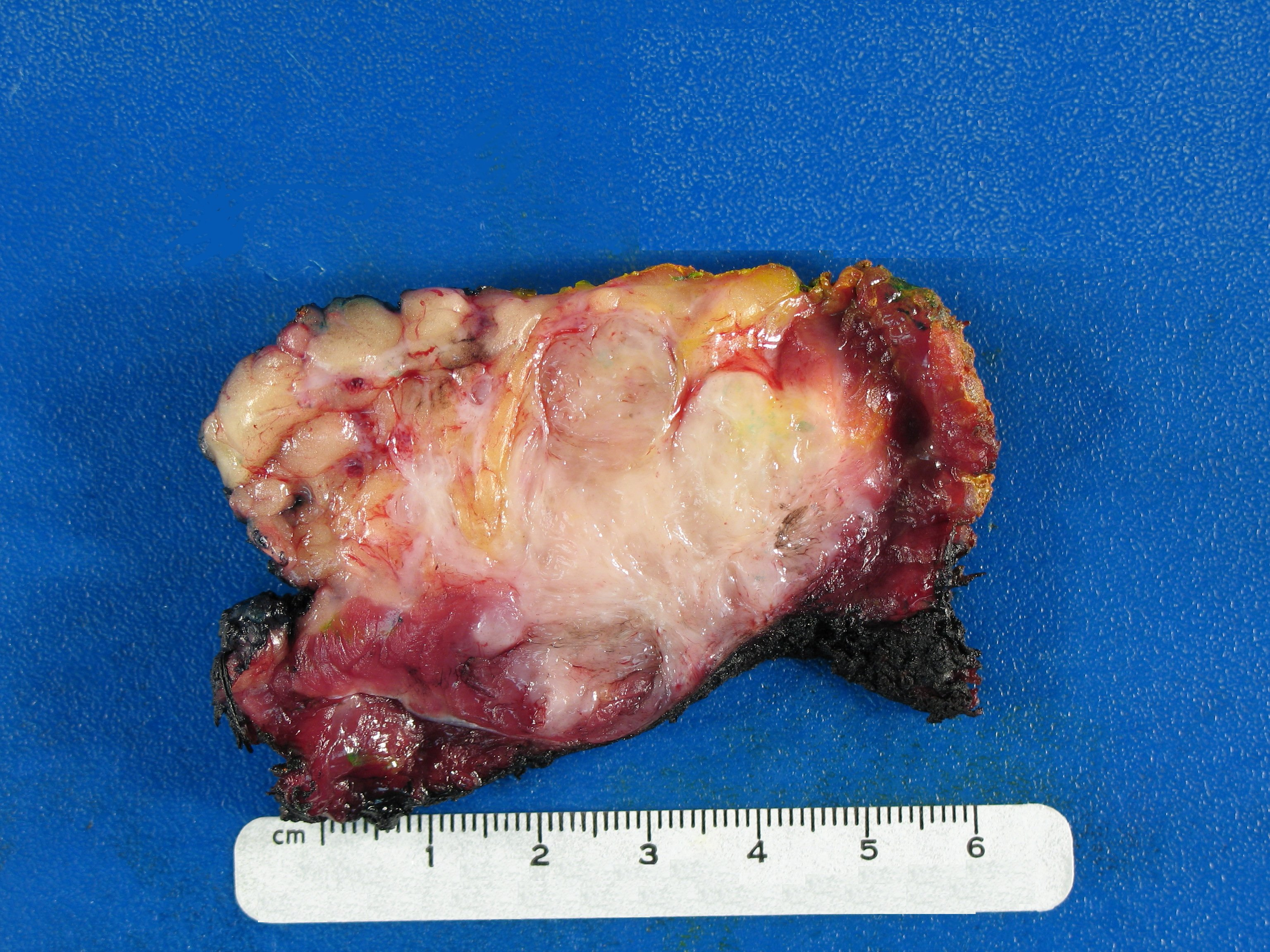
- The cut surface of desmoid-type fibromatosis is firm, white, and whorled. The white tumor infiltrates the adjacent skeletal muscle (red tissue – lower left) and fat (yellow tissue – upper left). This tendency for invasion of adjacent normal tissues and structures is the reason that desmoid-type fibromatosis has a relatively high rate of local recurrence, even after surgical removal.
- Specialty: Oncology

The term fibromatosis refers to a group of soft tissue tumors which have certain characteristics in common, including absence of cytologic and clinical malignant features, a histology consistent with proliferation of well-differentiated fibroblasts, an infiltrative growth pattern, and aggressive clinical behavior with frequent local recurrence. It is classed by the World Health Organization as an intermediate soft tissue tumor related to the sarcoma family. Arthur Purdy Stout coined the term fibromatosis (in the name congenital generalized fibromatosis, describing myofibromatosis), in 1954.

== Diagnosis ==
=== Juvenile subtypes ===
Subtypes of juvenile fibromatosis include:

- Infantile myofibromatosis: solitary tumors commonly occurring in the head and neck regions; multiple tumors occurring in the skin, subcutaneous tissue, muscles, and/or less commonly bones; or, rarely, tumors occurring in an internal organ(s).
- Aponeurotic fibroma
- Infantile digital fibromatosis
- Aggressive infantile fibromatosis
- Fibromatosis colli: benign sternocleidomastoid muscle tumor developing in infants within 8 weeks (average: 24 days) of delivery. It generally does not require resection and responds well to physiotherapy.
- Dermatofibrosis lenticularis (Buschke–Ollendorff syndrome)
- Fibromatosis hyalinica multiplex (juvenile hyaline fibromatosis)
- Lipofibromatosis

=== Adult subtypes ===
==== Superficial ====
- Palmar fibromatosis (Dupuytren's contracture)
- Plantar fibromatosis (Ledderhose disease)
- Penile fibromatosis (Peyronie's disease)
- Pachydermodactyly
- Knuckle pads
- Dermatofibroma
- Nodular fasciitis
- Elastofibroma
- Fibrous papule of the face

==== Deep ====
- Aggressive fibromatosis (desmoid tumors)
  - Abdominal, intra-abdominal, extra-abdominal

== Treatment ==
Treatment is mainly surgical; radiotherapy or chemotherapy is usually an indication of relapse. Head and neck desmoid fibromatosis is a serious condition due to local aggression, specific anatomical patterns and the high rate of relapse. For children surgery is particularly difficult, given the potential for growth disorders.

Treatment includes prompt radical excision with a wide margin and/or radiation. For aggressive fibromatosis, the consensus on treatment is observation for new tumors rather than immediate surgery. Despite their local infiltrative and aggressive behavior, mortality is minimal to nonexistent for peripheral tumors. In intra-abdominal fibromatosis associated with familial adenomatous polyposis (FAP), surgery is avoided if possible due to high rates of recurrence within the abdomen carrying significant morbidity and mortality. Conversely, for intra-abdominal fibromatosis without evidence of FAP extensive surgery may still be required for local symptoms, but the risk of recurrence is low.

== Terminology ==
Other names include musculoaponeurotic fibromatosis, referring to the tendency of these tumors to be adjacent to and infiltrating deep skeletal muscle, aggressive fibromatosis and desmoid tumor. A clear difference should be made between intra-abdominal and extra-abdominal localizations. Fibromatosis is a different entity from neurofibromatosis.
