= Walter Brown Shelley =

American Physician

Walter Brown Shelley (February 6, 1917 - January 30, 2009), was an American physician who made important contributions to the field of dermatology including itching, sweating, and piezogenic papules on the feet. He coined the word "keratinocyte".
