= MMP8 =

Protein-coding gene in the species Homo sapiens

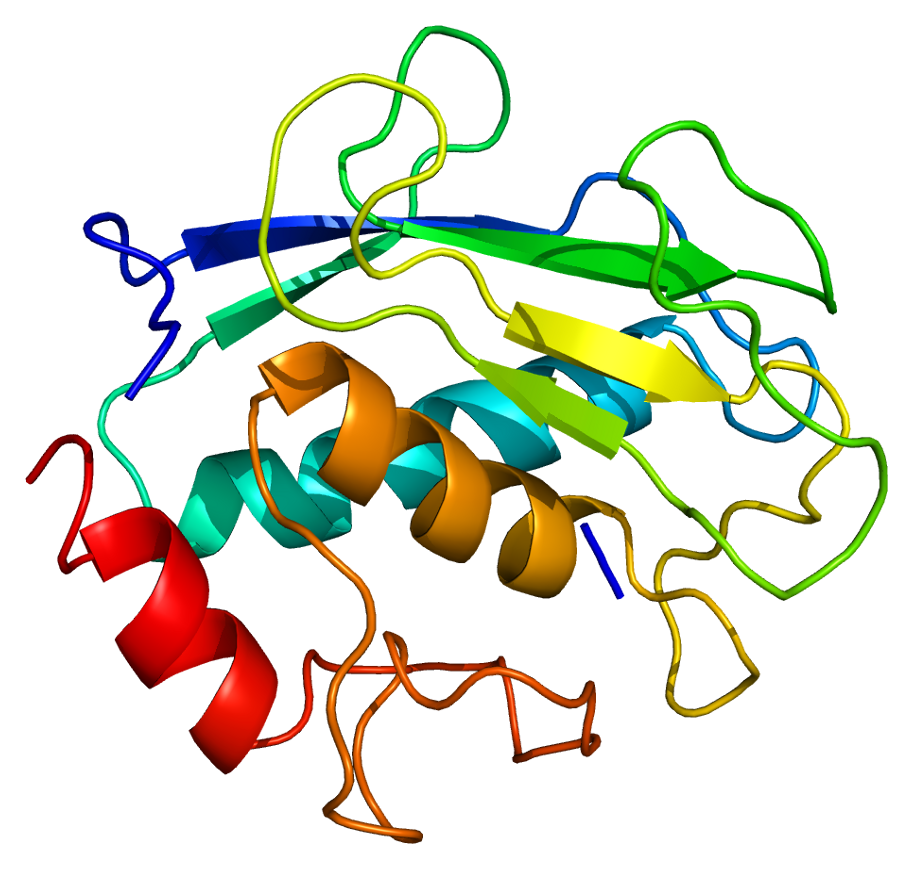

Identifiers
- Aliases: MMP8, CLG1, HNC, MMP-8, PMNL-CL, matrix metallopeptidase 8
- External IDs: OMIM: 120355; MGI: 1202395; GeneCards: MMP8
Available structures
PDB	Ortholog search: PDBe RCSB
PDB	List of PDB id codes 1A86, 1JAP, 1I76, 1ZVX, 3TT4, 2OY2, 1ZS0, 1JAN, 1MMB, 1I73, 1A85, 1KBC, 1ZP5, 1JH1, 3DPF, 1JAQ, 3DPE, 1BZS, 4QKZ, 1JAO, 3DNG, 2OY4, 1MNC
Enzyme activity
EC #	BRENDA	ExPASy	KEGG	MetaCyc
3.4.24.34	↗	↗	↗	↗

Gene location (Human)
Chr.	Chromosome 11 (human)
Band	11q22.2	Start	102,711,796 bp
Band	11q22.2	End	102,727,050 bp

Gene location (Mouse)
Chr.	Chromosome 9 (mouse)
Band	9|9 A1	Start	7,558,457 bp
Band	9|9 A1	End	7,568,486 bp
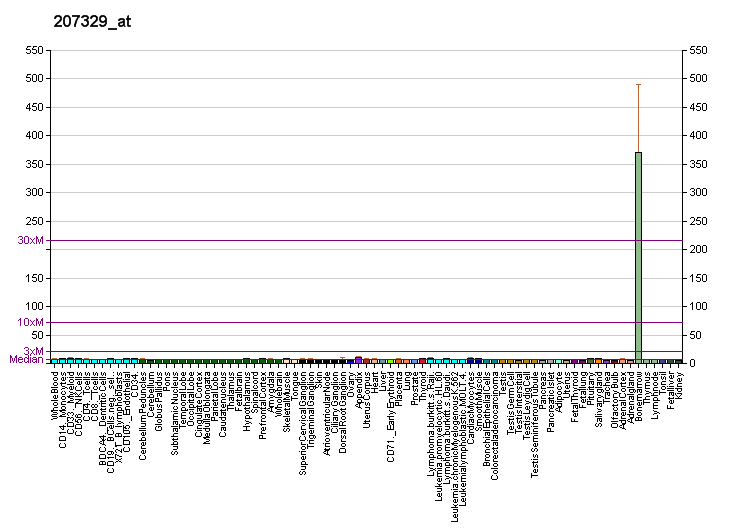
RNA expression pattern
Bgee	Human / Mouse (ortholog); Top expressed in: trabecular bone; bone marrow; bone marrow cell; testicle; monocyte; blood; amniotic fluid; spleen; granulocyte; upper lobe of left lung / Top expressed in: granulocyte; tibiofemoral joint; muscle of thorax; third toe; bone marrow; blood; second toe; cartilage tissue; hallux; bones of free part of lower limb; More reference expression data
BioGPS	More reference expression data
Gene ontology
Molecular function	zinc ion binding; peptidase activity; hydrolase activity; metallopeptidase activity; metal ion binding; serine-type endopeptidase activity; metalloendopeptidase activity; endopeptidase activity
Cellular component	extracellular matrix; extracellular region; specific granule lumen; tertiary granule lumen; extracellular space; collagen-containing extracellular matrix
Biological process	collagen catabolic process; extracellular matrix disassembly; endodermal cell differentiation; proteolysis; neutrophil degranulation; positive regulation of gene expression; negative regulation of gene expression; negative regulation of interleukin-10 production; positive regulation of interleukin-6 production; positive regulation of DNA binding; positive regulation of MAPK cascade; positive regulation of nitric oxide biosynthetic process; positive regulation of JNK cascade; regulation of neuroinflammatory response; positive regulation of neuroinflammatory response; positive regulation of NIK/NF-kappaB signaling; positive regulation of reactive oxygen species biosynthetic process; regulation of microglial cell activation; positive regulation of microglial cell activation; extracellular matrix organization
Sources:Amigo / QuickGO
Orthologs
Databases	NCBI: entry; OMA: entry
Species	Human	Mouse
Entrez	4317	17394
Ensembl	ENSG00000118113	ENSMUSG00000005800
UniProt	P22894	O70138
RefSeq (mRNA)	NM_001304441; NM_001304442; NM_002424	NM_008611
RefSeq (protein)	NP_001291370; NP_001291371; NP_002415	NP_032637
Location (UCSC)	Chr 11: 102.71 – 102.73 Mb	Chr 9: 7.56 – 7.57 Mb
PubMed search
- Wikidata
View/Edit Human	View/Edit Mouse

Neutrophil collagenase, also known as matrix metalloproteinase-8 (MMP-8) or PMNL collagenase (MNL-CL), is a collagen cleaving enzyme which is present in the connective tissue of most mammals. In humans, the MMP-8 protein is encoded by the MMP8 gene. The gene is part of a cluster of MMP genes which localize to chromosome 11q22.3. Most MMP's are secreted as inactive proproteins which are activated when cleaved by extracellular proteinases. However, the enzyme encoded by this gene is stored in secondary granules within neutrophils and is activated by autolytic cleavage.

== Function ==
Proteins of the matrix metalloproteinase (MMP) family are involved in the breakdown of extracellular matrix in normal physiological processes, such as embryonic development, reproduction, and tissue remodeling, as well as in disease processes, such as arthritis and metastasis. The primary function of MMP-8 is the degradation of type I, II and III collagens. In cancer, loss of MMP-8 in the murine MMTV-PyMT breast cancer model has been associated with increased tumor growth and metastatic burden, as well as enhanced tumor vascularity and altered immune cell infiltration. Furthermore, analysis of MMP-8 in breast cancer cell lines revealed a causal connection between MMP-8 activity and IL6 and IL8 production, suggesting a role for MMP-8 in the regulation of the innate immune system.
