= Knuckle pads =

Disease of the skin of human fingers

- Specialty: Rheumatology

Knuckle pads, also known as heloderma, meaning similar to the skin of the Gila monster lizard for which it is named, are circumscribed, keratotic, fibrous growths over the dorsa of the interphalangeal joints. They are described as well-defined, round, plaque-like, fibrous thickening that may develop at any age, and grow to be 10 to 15mm in diameter in the course of a few weeks or months, then go away over time.

Knuckle pads are sometimes associated with Dupuytren's contracture and camptodactyly, and histologically, the lesions are fibromas. Knuckle pads are generally non-responsive to treatment, including corticosteroids, and tend to recur after surgery; however, there has been some effectiveness with intralesional fluorouracil.

== Signs and symptoms ==
Knuckle pads are benign subcutaneous fibrotic nodules that are seen in the finger joints and/or the extensor area of the foot. From a clinical perspective, these are well-defined, non-compressible, freely moveable lesions that resemble warts and primarily affect the dorsal portion of the proximal interphalangeal (PIP) and, less frequently, the metacarpophalangeal (MCP) joints. Knuckle pads are often asymptomatic, painless, and progressive in their growth, reaching their final size of up to 40 mm in diameter. They also do not cause any functional impact on the joints, such as decreased flexibility or altered tendons.

== Causes ==
Since the pathogenesis is yet unclear, knuckle pads are usually idiopathic. They are a fibromatous illness characterized by fibroblast growth leading to fibrosis.

Acrokeratoelastoidosis of Costa, camptodactyly, epidermolytic palmoplantar keratoderma, Dupuytren's disease, plantar fibromatosis (Ledderhose's disease), and Bart-Pumphrey syndrome are among the hereditary syndromes in which knuckle pads may be observed.

Knuckle pads can also be acquired subsequent to trauma. In sports like boxers and swimmers, as well as in some occupations like carpet layers, secondary knuckle pads are well-documented. Knuckle pads have also been reported in individuals suffering from obsessive-compulsive disorder and bulimia nervosa. Individuals with excoriation disorder often bite their knuckles to relieve stress/tension.

== Diagnosis ==
The diagnosis of knuckle pads is clinical. The differential diagnosis includes retained foreign objects, neurofibromas, rheumatoid nodules, gouty tophi, warts, xanthomas, synovial cysts, and Bouchards and Heberdens nodes. When a diagnosis is unclear, plain radiographs, histology (if sonography is not conclusive), and ultrasound improve the information-gathering process and lower the possibility of a misdiagnosis.

Knuckle pads show up as noncompressible, dome-shaped, hypoechoic nodules on ultrasonography and as peripheral or nonexistent vascularization on Doppler analysis. On histology, the pads show enhanced proliferation of (myo-)fibroblasts, which is frequently linked to hyperkeratosis.

== Treatment ==
In the lack of targeted and efficacious treatments, a stressful wait-and-see strategy is typically advised. Surgery has also been utilized, though typically without producing a change in appearance. Potential adverse effects include scars, keloids, post-operative loss of joint flexibility, and recurrences.

A small number of treatments have shown promise recently, but they are frequently moderately to highly invasive and are primarily based on case reports. Intralesional triamcinolone, fluorouracil, cantharidin-podophyllotoxin-salicylic acid, and topical high-dose salicylic acid and urea have all been successfully applied, according to certain authors.

If the knuckle pads are caused by repetitive trauma, they should heal in a couple of months after the trauma ceases.

== See also ==
- List of cutaneous conditions
- Garrod's pad
