= Elastofibroma dorsi =

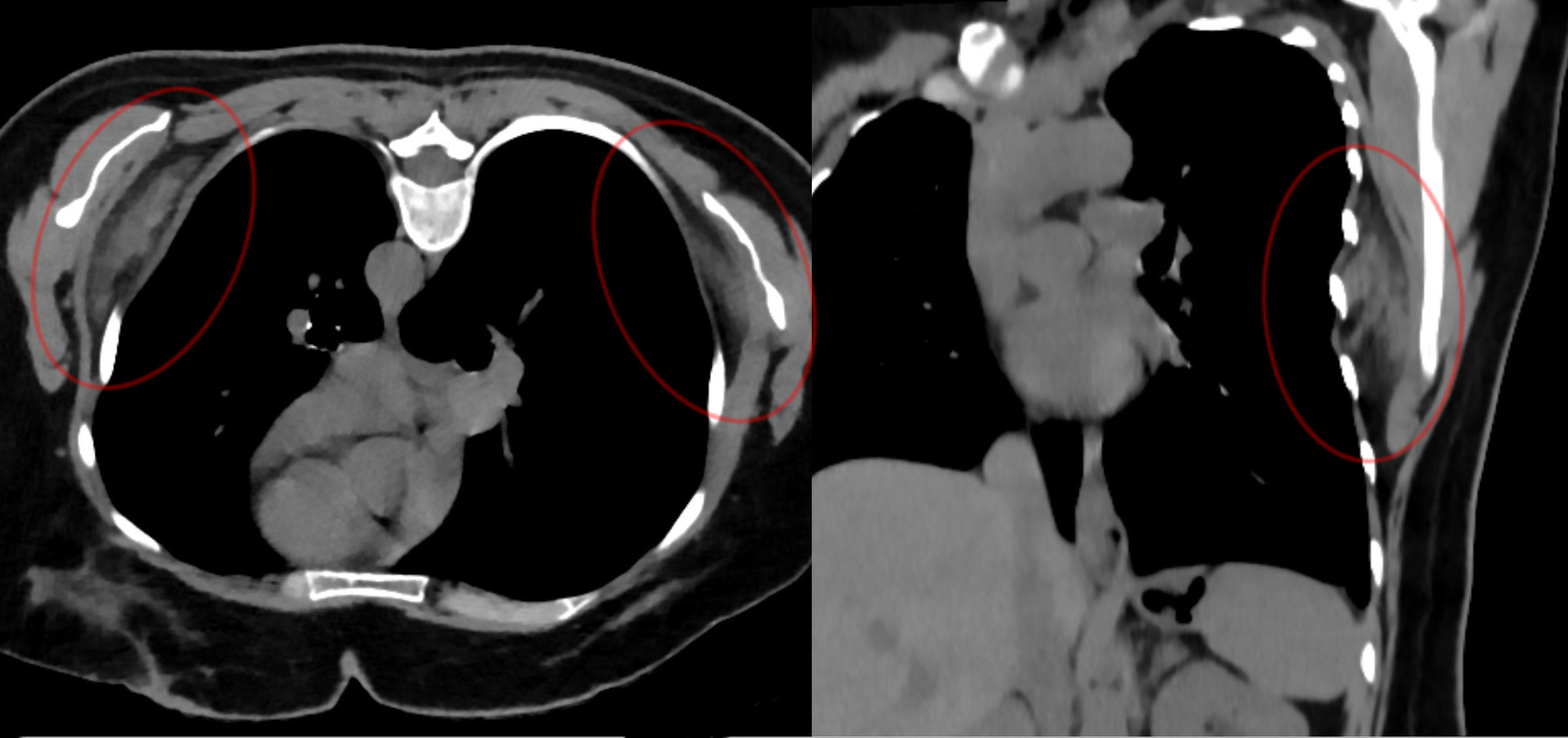
- Bilateral elastofibroma dorsi in native computed tomography: left image axial in prone position (for biopsy), right image oblique coronal view.

Elastofibroma dorsi is an ill-defined fibroelastic tumor-like condition made up of enlarged and irregular elastic fibers. The World Health Organization, 2020, has classified elastofibroma tumors as one specific type of the fibroblastic and myofibroblastic tumors.

== Signs and symptoms ==
Patient will present with a slow growing, deep-seated, firm mass, often presenting bilaterally. There may be pain or tenderness, but this is rare.

When only present on one side, they are more often present on the right side.

== Cause ==
There are several theories about origin:

- There is support for a genetic predisposition, as there are alterations of short arm of chromosome 1;
- Multifocality may suggest systemic enzymatic defect, resulting in abnormal elastogenesis;
- Repeated trauma or friction seems unlikely, but is still a possibility.

== Diagnosis ==
By computed tomography, there is a poorly circumscribed, heterogeneous soft tissue mass, with a signal intensity similar to skeletal muscle. The fact that the lesion may be bilateral, helps eliminate a sarcoma from further consideration. At US, elastofibromas are depicted deep to the musculature as a multilayered pattern of hypoechoic linear areas of fat deposition intermixed with echogenic fibroelastic tissue. The mass often protrudes from the subscapular region upon shoulder abduction, allowing better delineation of the finding.

=== Pathology findings ===
In general, the tumor is an ill-defined, nonencapsulated, rubbery, and firm, white lesion with interspersed fat. The tumors can be quite large (up to 20 cm), although most are around 5 cm.

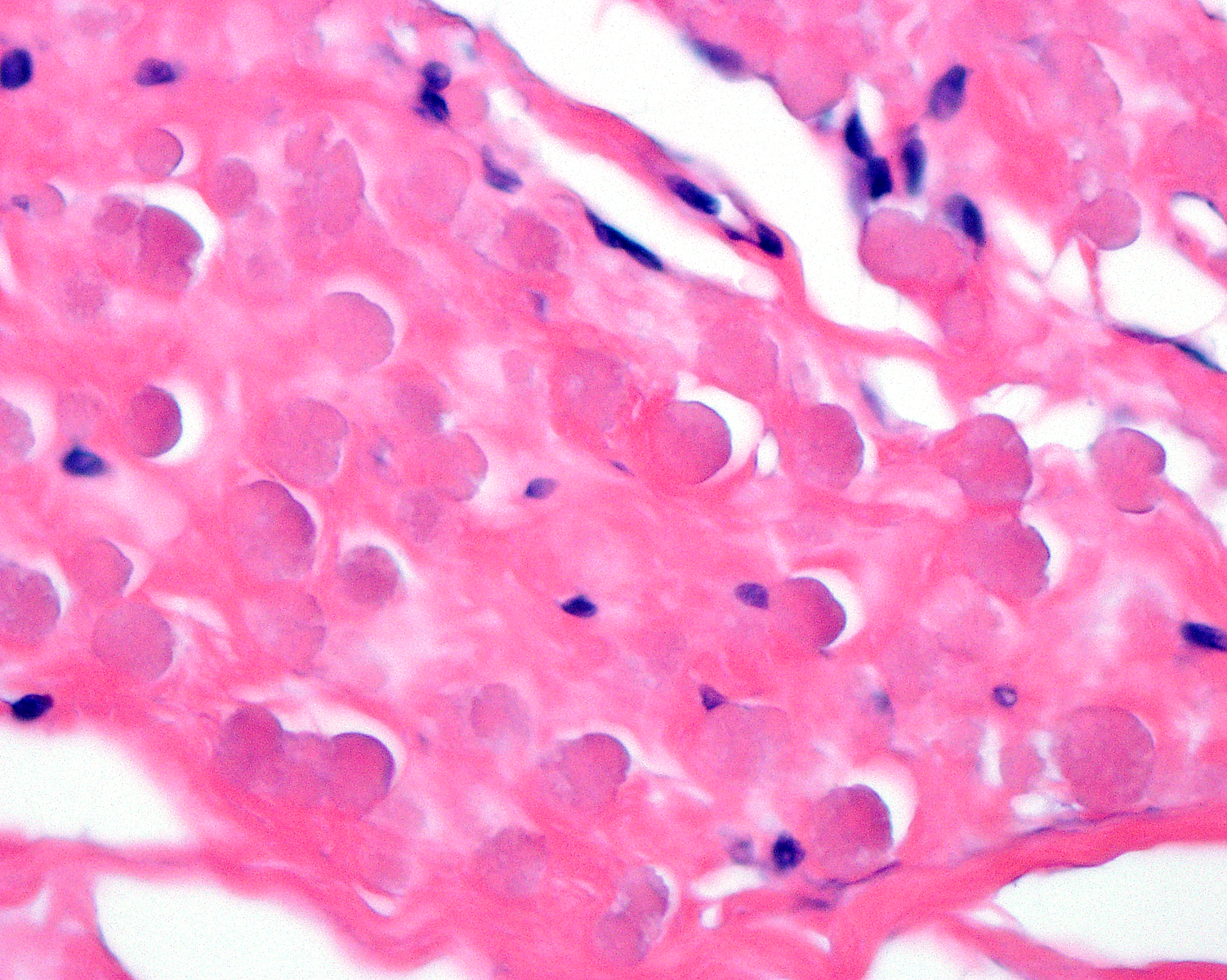
A high power photomicrograph of an elastofibroma.

By microscopy view, there is an admixture of heavy dense bands of collagenous tissue dissected by fat and abnormal elastic fibers. The elastic fibers are often quite large and are easily identified. The elastic fibers are coarse, thick, and darkly eosinophilic, often fragmented into globules, creating a "string of pearls" or "pipe cleaner" appearance. Because of degeneration, the elastic fibers will appear as globules with a serrated or "prickled" edge.

=== Histochemistry ===
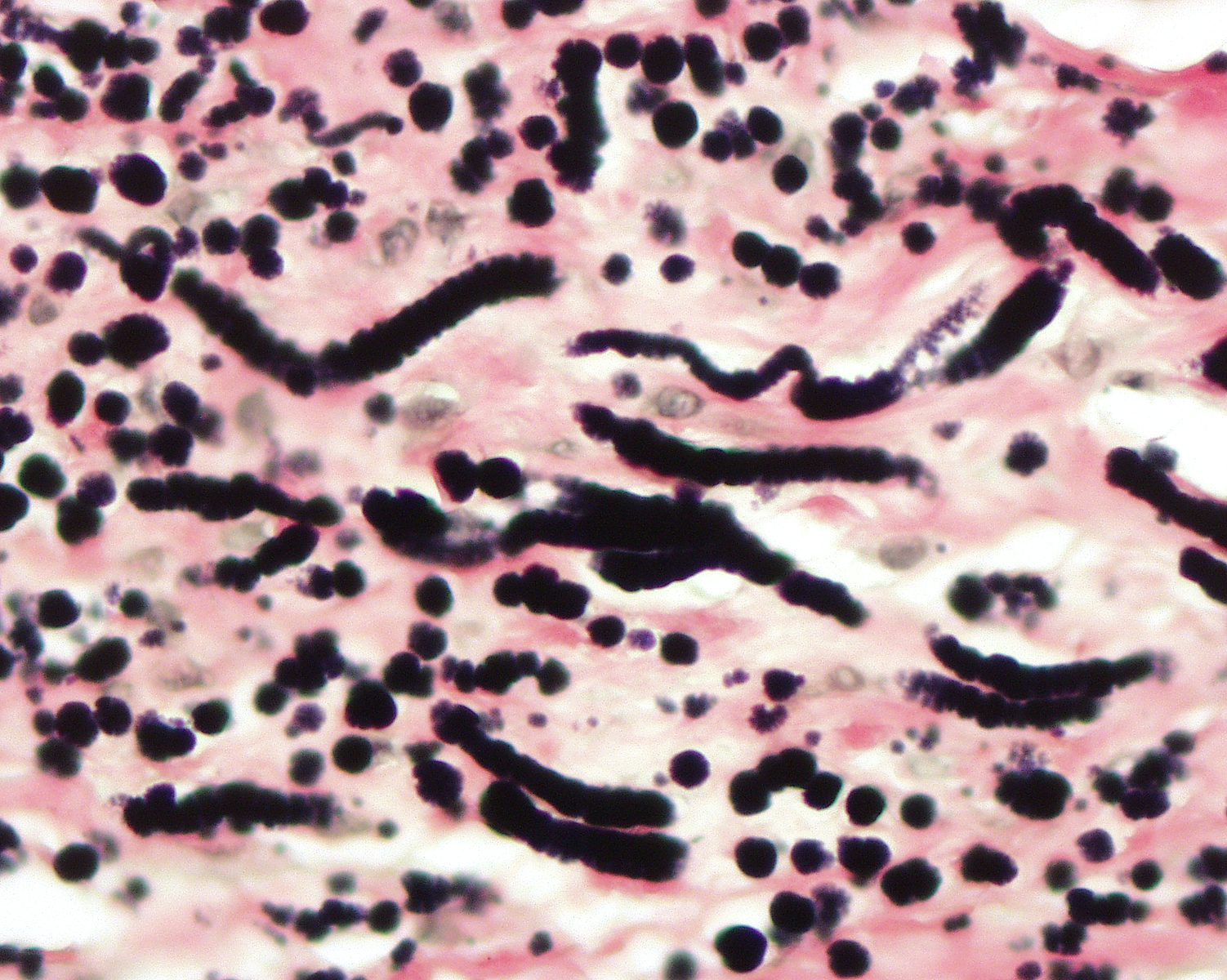
An elastic stain photomicrograph at high power highlighting the elastic fibers in black.

The elastic fibers will be highlighted by a Weigert or von Gieson elastic stains.

=== Differential diagnoses ===
Given the anatomic site, a spindle cell lipoma, nuchal-type fibroma and fibromatosis colli are all included in the differential diagnosis.

== Management ==
Simple excision is the treatment of choice, although given the large size, bleeding into the space can be a potential complication. Isolated recurrences may be seen, but there is no malignant potential.

== Epidemiology ==
This is a very rare phenomenon (< 0.001% of soft tissue tumors), usually presenting in elderly patients (>50 years of age), and more commonly in women than men (5:1). There is an increased frequency in Okinawa, Japan, but this may be a reporting bias. The tumor develops very specifically in the subscapular or infrascapular area, deep to the muscle, sometimes even attached to periosteum of ribs. It is usually between the shoulder blade and the lower neck, with rare tumors reported in the chest wall.

== See also ==
- Skin lesion
