= Aponeurotic fibroma =

Rare fibrous tumor usually present on the hands or feet

- Other names: Calcifying aponeurotic fibroma, juvenile aponeurotic fibroma
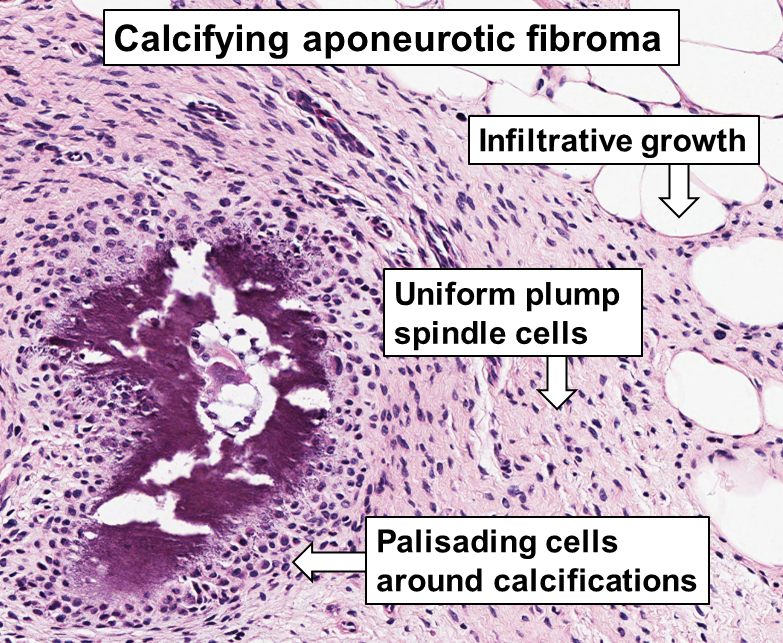
- Histopathology of a calcifying aponeurotic fibroma from a finger, H&E stain.

Aponeurotic fibroma, also known as calcifying aponeurotic fibroma, and juvenile aponeurotic fibroma is characterized by a lesion that usually presents as a painless, solitary, deep fibrous nodule, often adherent to tendon, fascia, or periosteum, on the hands and feet. The World Health Organization in 2020 reclassified aponeurotic fibroma nodules as a specific benign type of the fibroblastic and myofibroblastic tumors. Aponeurotic fibromas are diagnosed based on histopathology and treated by surgical excision. They are more common in males than females.

== Signs and symptoms ==
Aponeurotic fibroma occurs most frequently in the fingers, palms, and soles of the distal extremities. Typically, the tumor is defined as a smaller than 3 cm diameter, firm, non-tender mass that grows slowly. It is prone to infiltrate the surrounding tissue and, following surgical resection, is more likely to recur locally.

== Diagnosis ==
A histological examination is necessary to make a diagnosis. Histologically, the tumor is characterized by fibroblast growth and calcification.

Imaging results include edematous alterations and subcutaneous neoplastic tumors with hazy margins that appear to be encroaching on the surrounding tissues. The fascia and tendon sheath are next to the tumor. While T2WI displays heterogeneous signals, T1WI displays signals that are hypointense to isointense. Additionally, there is heterogeneous contrast enhancement.

== Treatment ==
The treatment of choice for an aponeurotic fibroma is surgical excision.

== Epidemiology ==
Aponeurotic fibroma is a rare tumor. The tumor often manifests in the first or second decade of life, while examples have been documented at birth and 67 years of age. Patients who are male are impacted twice as frequently as those who are female.

== See also ==
- Skin lesion
- Fibromatosis
