= Palmar aponeurosis =

Aponeurosis of the palm of the hand

Palmar aponeurosis.
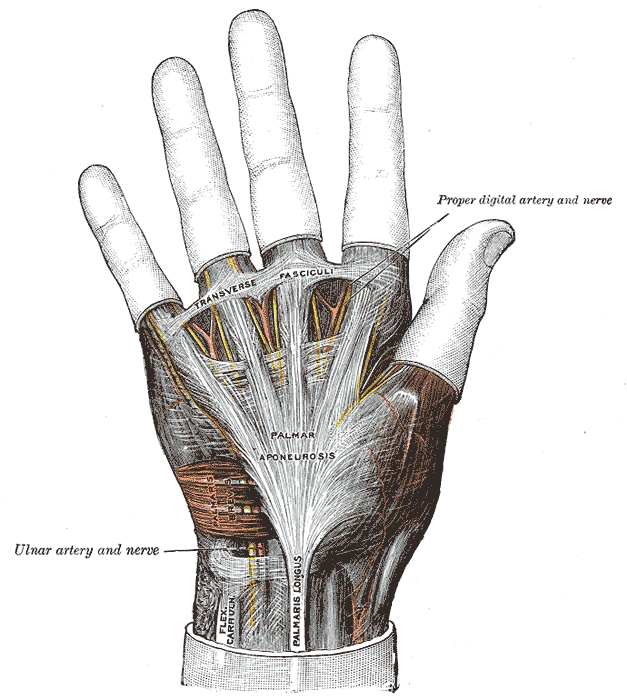
- The palmar aponeurosis

Details

Identifiers
- Latin: aponeurosis palmaris
- TA98: A04.6.03.012
- TA2: 2549
- FMA: 42435

The palmar aponeurosis (palmar fascia) invests the muscles of the palm, and consists of central, lateral, and medial portions.

== Structure ==
The central portion occupies the middle of the palm, is triangular in shape, and of great strength

Its apex is continuous with the lower margin of the transverse carpal ligament, and receives the expanded tendon of the palmaris longus.

Its base divides below into four slips, one for each finger. Each slip gives off superficial fibers to the skin of the palm and finger, those to the palm joining the skin at the furrow corresponding to the metacarpophalangeal articulations, and those to the fingers passing into the skin at the transverse fold at the bases of the fingers.

The deeper part of each slip subdivides into two processes, which are inserted into the fibrous sheaths of the flexor tendons. From the sides of these processes offsets are attached to the transverse metacarpal ligament.

By this arrangement short channels are formed on the front of the heads of the metacarpal bones; through these the flexor tendons pass. The intervals between the four slips transmit the digital vessels and nerves, and the tendons of the lumbricales.

At the points of division into the slips mentioned, numerous strong, transverse fasciculi bind the separate processes together.

The central part of the palmar aponeurosis is intimately bound to the integument by dense fibroareolar tissue forming the superficial palmar fascia, and gives origin by its medial margin to the palmaris brevis.

It covers the superficial volar arch, the tendons of the flexor muscles, and the branches of the median and ulnar nerves; and on either side it gives off a septum, which is continuous with the interosseous aponeurosis, and separates the intermediate from the collateral groups of muscles.

=== Lateral and medial portions ===
The lateral and medial portions of the palmar aponeurosis are thin, fibrous layers, which cover, on the radial side, the muscles of the ball of the thumb, and, on the ulnar side, the muscles of the little finger; they are continuous with the central portion and with the fascia on the dorsum of the hand.

== Additional images ==
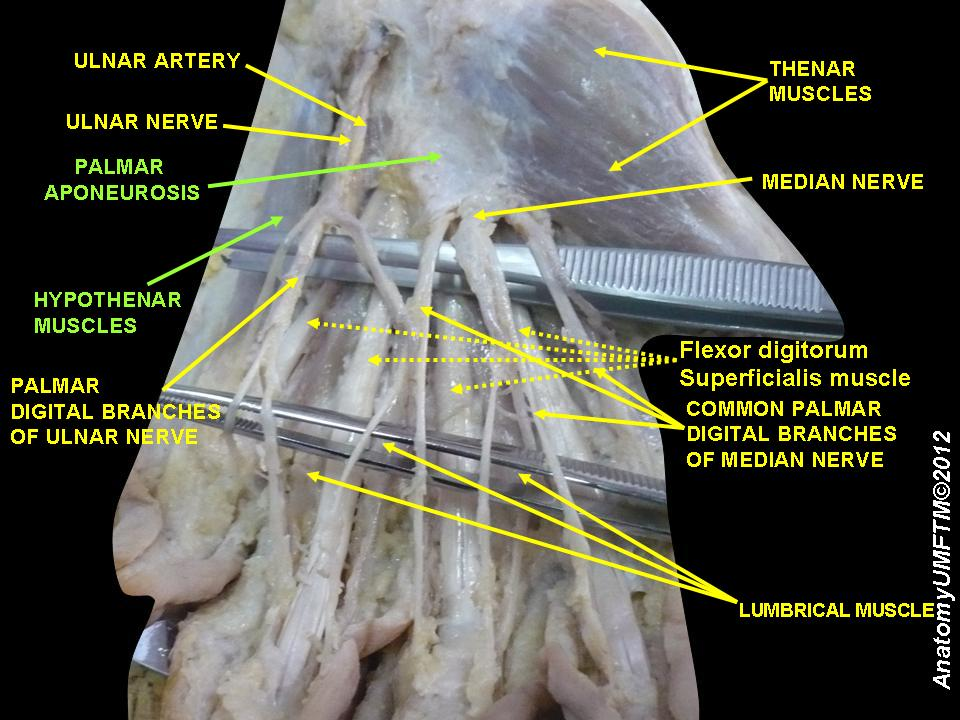
Palmar aponeurosis

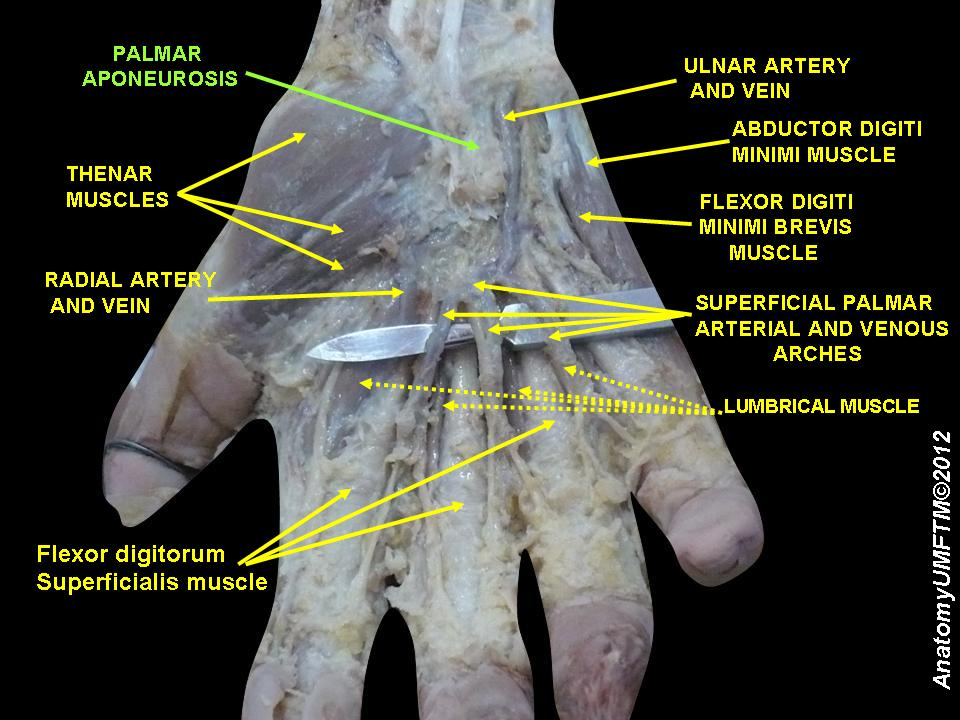
Palmar aponeurosis

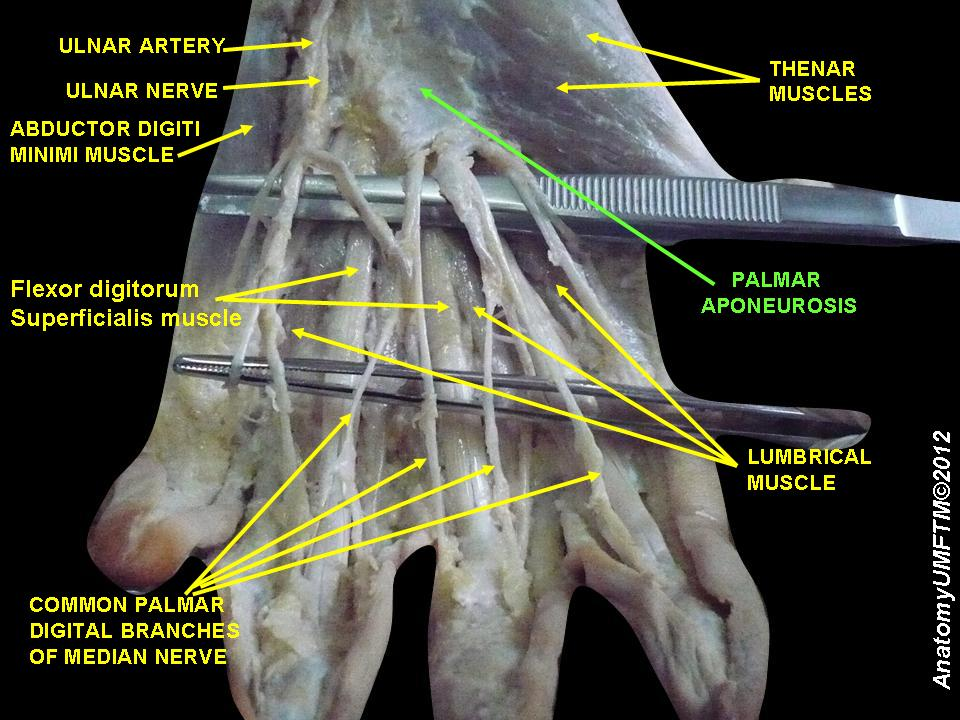
Palmar aponeurosis

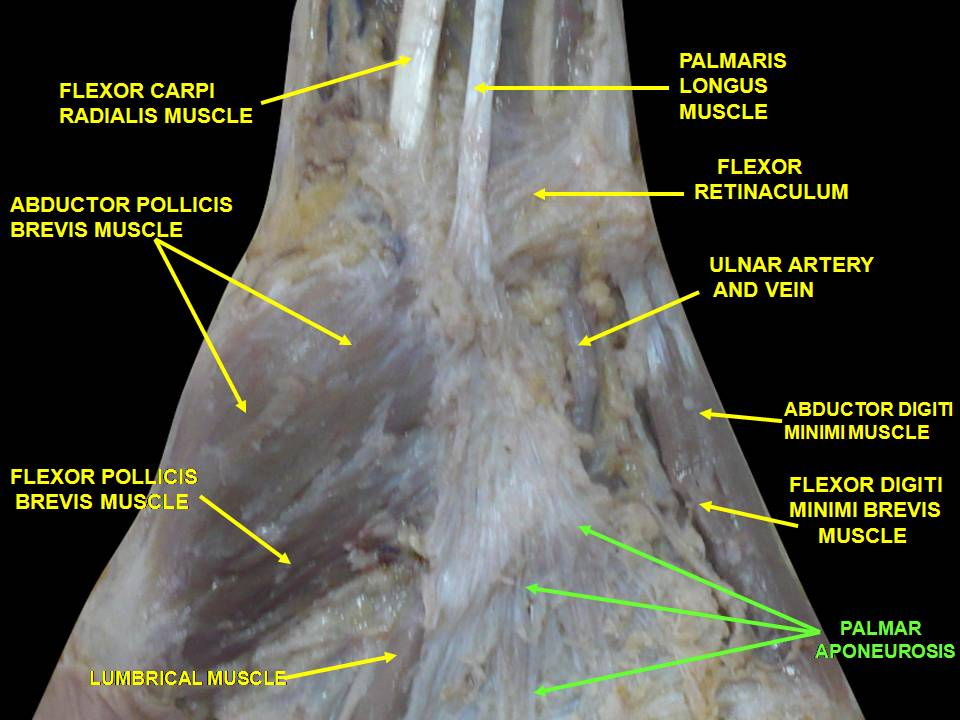
Palmar aponeurosis
