= Transverse Ligament of the Palmar Aponeurosis =

Ligament of the palm

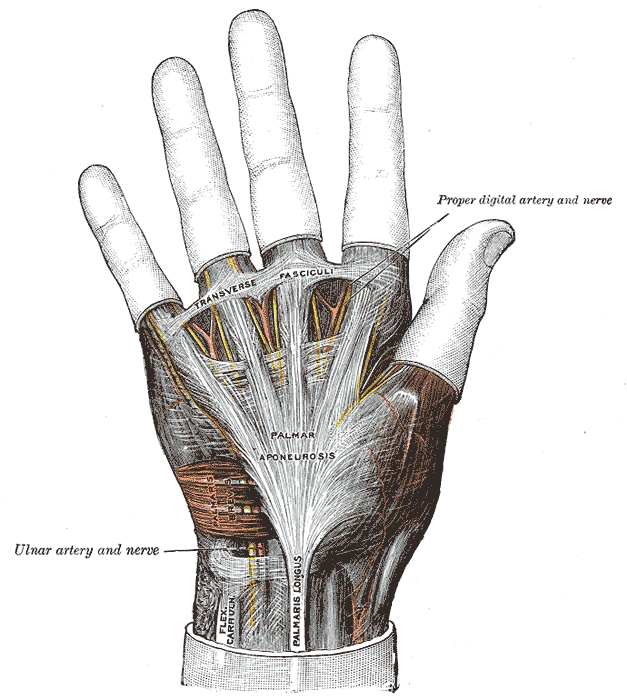
- Volar (palmar) aspect of the palmar aponeurosis (fascia).

Identifiers
- TA98: A04.6.03.011
- TA2: 2548
- FMA: 42458

The Transverse Ligament of the Palmar Aponeurosis (TLPA) is a thin band of transverse fibers of the distal portion of the palmar aponeurosis. It runs deep and transverse to the longitudinally oriented pretendinous bands of the palmar fascial complex, and serves as an attachment point for the septa of Legueu and Juvara.

The TLPA is also known as the "Ligament of Skoog". It should not be confused with the Natatory Ligament (also known as the "Superficial Transverse Metacarpal Ligament"), which runs parallel and distal to the TLPA, forming the webbing in between the bases of the fingers.
