= Nirogacestat =

Chemical compound

Clinical data
- Trade names: Ogsiveo
- Other names: PF-03084014, PF-3084014
- AHFS/Drugs.com: Ogsiveo
- MedlinePlus: a624011
- License data: US DailyMed: Nirogacestat
- Routes of administration: By mouth
- Drug class: Gamma-secretase inhibitor
- ATC code: L01XX81 (WHO)

Legal status
- Legal status: US: ℞-only; EU: Rx-only

Identifiers
- IUPAC name: (S)-2-((S)-5,7-Difluoro-1,2,3,4-tetrahydronaphthalen-3-ylamino)-N-(1-(2-methyl-1-(neopentylamino)propan-2-yl)-1H-imidazol-4-yl)pentanamide
- CAS Number: 1290543-63-3; Hydrobromide: 1962925-29-6
- PubChem CID: 46224413
- PubChem SID: 347828323
- IUPHAR/BPS: 7746
- DrugBank: DB12005
- ChemSpider: 26232306
- UNII: QZ62892OFJ; Hydrobromide: 9T1XY6L45Y
- KEGG: D10960; Hydrobromide: D11453
- ChEBI: CHEBI:229217
- ChEMBL: ChEMBL1770916
- PDB ligand: O6U (PDBe, RCSB PDB)
- CompTox Dashboard (EPA): DTXSID60235679

Chemical and physical data
- Formula: C_{27}H_{41}F_{2}N_{5}O
- Molar mass: 489.656 g·mol^{−1}
- 3D model (JSmol): Interactive image
- Solubility in water: 11.4 mg/mL (water)
- SMILES: CCC[C@@](N[C@@]1([H])CCC2=CC(F)=CC(F)=C2C1)([H])/C(O)=N/C3=CN(C(C)(CNCC(C)(C)C)C)C=N3
- InChI: InChI=1S/C27H41F2N5O/c1-7-8-23(32-20-10-9-18-11-19(28)12-22(29)21(18)13-20)25(35)33-24-14-34(17-31-24)27(5,6)16-30-15-26(2,3)4/h11-12,14,17,20,23,30,32H,7-10,13,15-16H2,1-6H3,(H,33,35)/t20-,23-/m0/s1; Key:VFCRKLWBYMDAED-REWPJTCUSA-N

Nirogacestat, sold under the brand name Ogsiveo, is an anti-cancer medication used for the treatment of desmoid tumors. It is a selective gamma secretase inhibitor that is taken by mouth.

Nirogacestat was approved for medical use in the United States in November 2023. It is the first medication approved by the US Food and Drug Administration (FDA) for the treatment of desmoid tumors. The FDA considers it to be a first-in-class medication.

== Medical uses ==
Nirogacestat is indicated for adults with progressing desmoid tumors who require systemic treatment.

== Adverse effects ==
Nirogacestat treatment has been associated with several notable adverse effects across multiple studies. Hypophosphatemia is a significant and common side effect, with an incidence exceeding 40% in patients with various cancers including desmoid tumors, sarcoma, metastatic breast cancer, and solid organ cancers. Gastrointestinal toxicity is another concern, and glucocorticosteroid pretreatment and post-treatment regimens have shown efficacy in mitigating these effects in clinical trials.

Reproductive toxicity has been observed in animal studies, with findings including ovarian atrophy, amenorrhea, premature menopause, reduced testes weight, and decreased sperm concentration and motility; some of these effects may be irreversible. There is a possible risk of non-melanoma skin cancer development. In vivo rat studies showed embryotoxicity, including decreased body weight, implantation loss and subcutis edema at doses lower than the recommended human dose. Additionally, there has been a reported case of eruptive milia in association with nirogacestat therapy.

Nirogacestat have been found to induce grade 1 or 2 adverse effects, with exception of hypophosphatemia at grade 3:

- diarrhea
- nausea and vomiting
- abdominal pain
- fatigue
- maculopapular rash, folliculitis, hidradenitis
- anorexia
- fatigue
- stomatitis
- cough
- alopecia
- upper respiratory tract infection
- dyspnea
- headache
- lymphopenia
- trombocytopenia
- liver toxicity (alanine transaminase and aspartate transaminase increase)
- hypophosphatemia, hypokalemia
- anaphylaxis
- glycosuria
- proteinuria

== Pharmacology ==
=== Pharmacodynamics ===
Nirogacestat works as a gamma secretase inhibitor, which blocks the activation of the Notch receptor, stopping tumor growth.

Nirogacestat's indirect action on Notch intracellular domain (NICD) and amyloid precursor protein (APP) due to gamma-secretase inhibition are described in the table below.

Nirogacestat IC_{50} values
Target		IC_{50} (nM)
gamma-secretase (cell-free assay)		6.2; 1.2
NICD	Notch1	30.6
NICD	Notch2	27.8
NICD	Notch3	11.5
NICD	Notch4	42.6
APP	intracellular domain	19.3
APP	amyloid β-40	25.8

Nirogacestat's binding to gamma-secretase assessed with cryogenic electron microscopy showed that it localises in the persenilin 1 catalytic subunit. Four hydrogen bonds are involved in this interaction, where two come from lysine (position 380 within the amino-acid sequence of gamma-secretase) and two from leucine (position 432). Its alignment selectively obstructs the site of Notch cleavage by gamma-secretase, which occurs in its β-sheet, allowing inhibition of downstream Notch signalling.

Nirogacestat 3D pharmacophore description
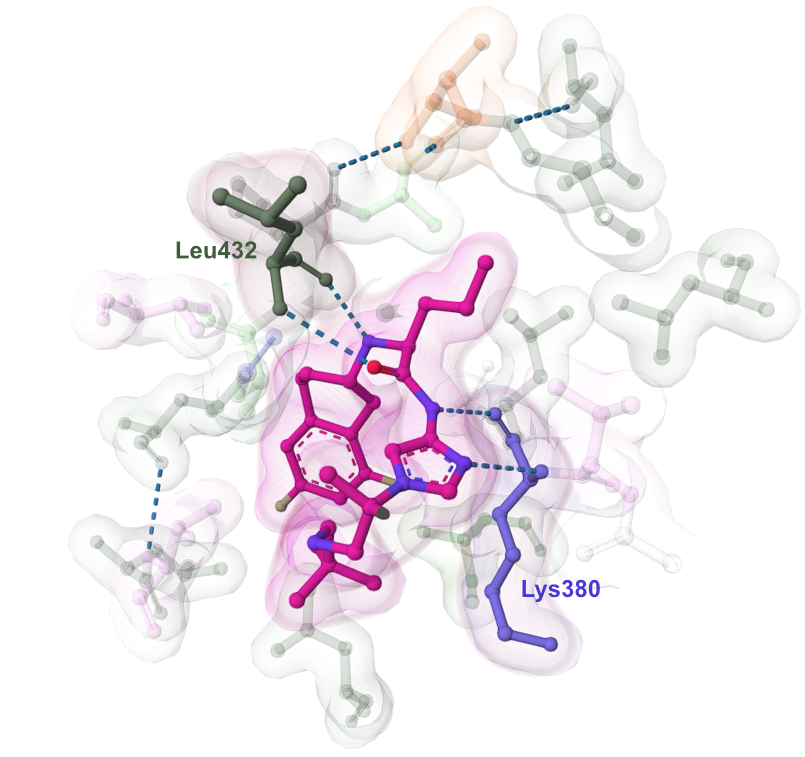
Nirogacestat pharmacophore

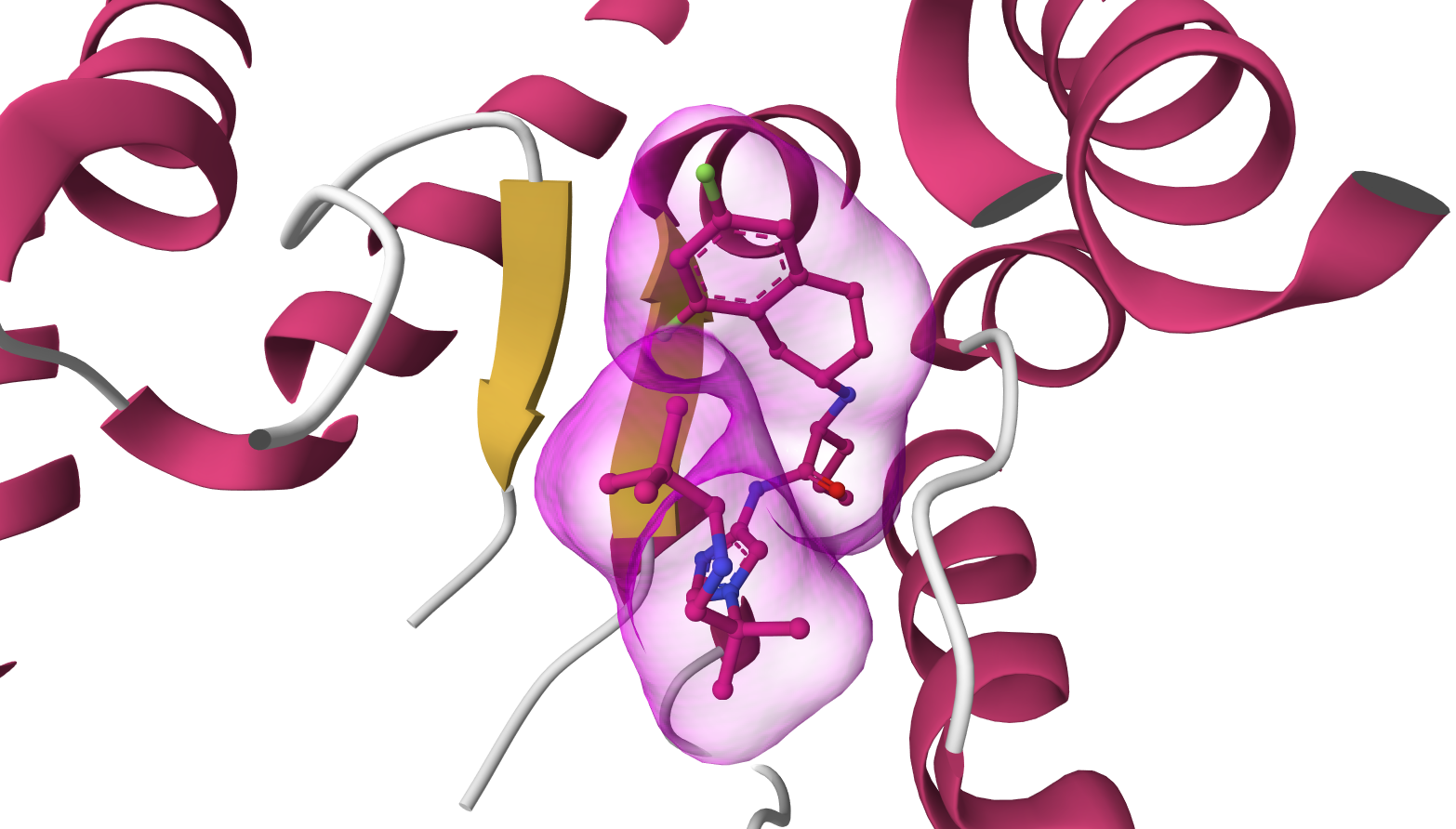
Beta-sheet (yellow) alingment of nirogacestat in persenilin 1 subunit

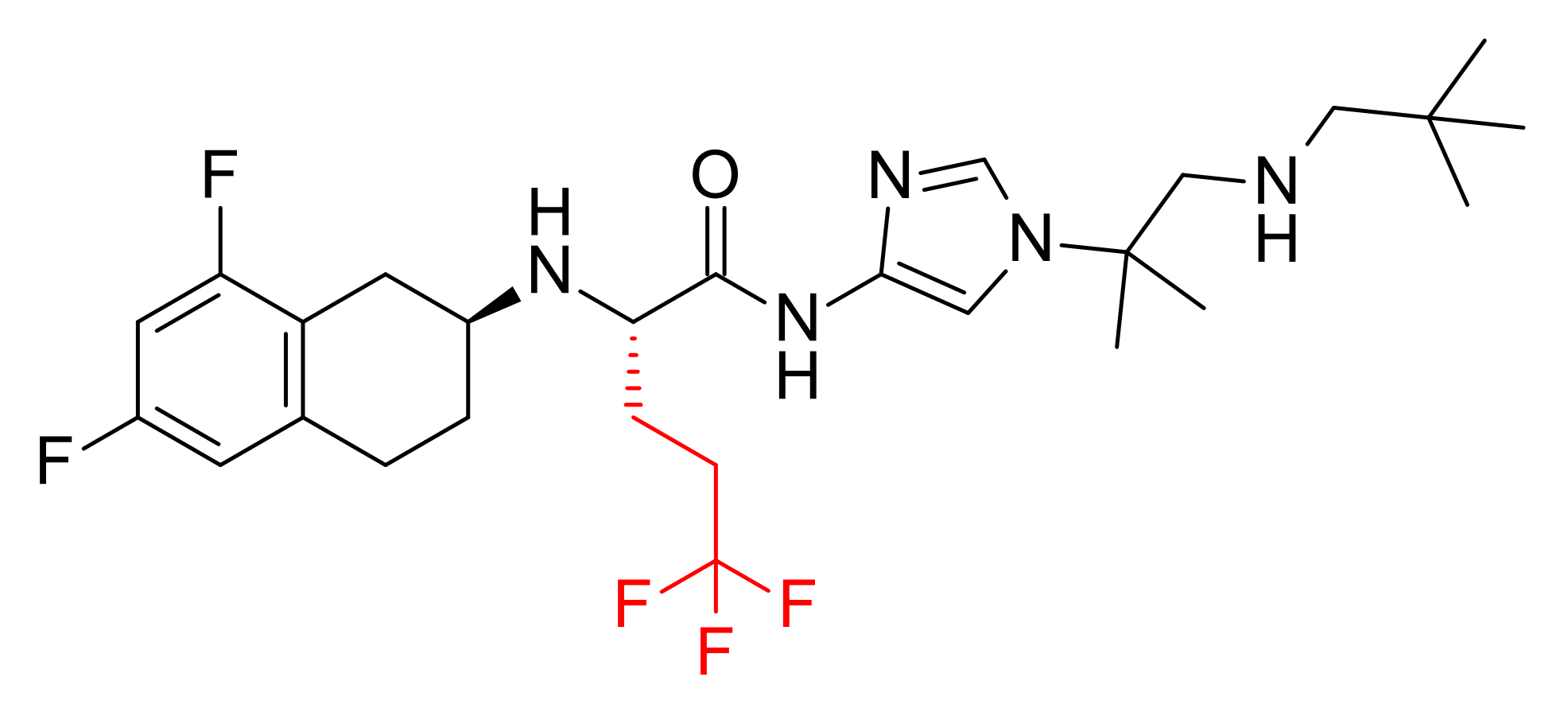
Nirogacestat trifluoropropyl derivative with enhanced persenilin binding pocket affinity

Moreover, nirogacestat's pharmacophore is consistent with other gamma-secretase inhibitors (e.g., crenigacestat) in terms of three dimensional arrangement in the binding cavity. Leucine342 hydrogen bond interaction is shared amongst these compounds

A slight modification of nirogacestat's structure, where the propyl group is substituted by a trifluoropropyl group, results in enhanced binding-pocket occupation and better inhibition.

=== Pharmacokinetics ===
Nirogacestat's pharmacokinetic parameters in patients with desmoid tumors are as follows:

Pharmacokinetic profile of nirogacestat
Steady state
Time to steady-state	approx. 6 days	
C_{max}	580 ng/mL	
AUC_{0-τ}	3370 ng·h/mL	
AUC_{∞}	at 50 mg dose	375-725 ng·h/mL
AUC_{∞}	at 100 mg dose	1200-233 ng·h/mL
AUC_{∞}	at 150 mg dose	2000-4000 ng·h/mL
Accumulation ratio	1.6 (median 1.3-4.6)	
Absorption
Time to peak concentration (T_{max})	1.5 h (median 0.5-6.5)	
Absolute bioavailability	19%	
Food effect [dose-normalised geometric mean ratio, 90% CI)	C_{max}	93% (55%, 166%)
Food effect [dose-normalised geometric mean ratio, 90% CI)	AUC	114% (76%, 171%)
Effective permeability (in vivo, human Caco-2 cells)	2.7	
Distribution
Protein binding	Serum protein	99.6%
Protein binding	Human albumin	94.6%
Protein binding	α_{1}-acid glycoprotein	97.9%
Plasma unbound fraction (in mice)	2.6%	
Microsomal unbound fraction (human liver cells)	81%	
Blood-plasma concentration ratio (in mice)	0.52	
Apparent volume of distribution (observed/predicted)	1430 L (mean 65)	
Metabolism
Primary	N-dealkylation via CYP3A4 (85%)	
Secondary	CYP3A4, CYP2C19, CYP2C9, CYP2D6	
Elimination
Intrinsic clearance (in mice)	227 mL/min·kg	
Apparent systemic clearance (observed/predicted)	45 L/hr (mean 58)	
Terminal elimination half-life (t_{1/2})	23 h (mean 37)	
Excretion	Feces	38%
Excretion	Urine	17% (<1% unchanged)
Excretion	Expired air	9.7%

=== Drug interactions ===
Nirogacestat can interfere with several drugs that are metabolised through cytochrome P450 pathways, especially through CYP3A family and CYP2C19. Additionally, gastric acid-neutralising medications impaired its absorption and thus reduced its plasma concentration.

== Chemistry ==
=== Physicochemical properties ===
Nirogacestat's chemical properties were evaluated in silico and in vitro in mice and are as follows:

Nirogacestat's chemical profile
Parameter	in silico	in vitro
lipophilicity (cLogP)	4.01	2.07
solubility in water (mg/mL)	0.32 (pH=9.7)	2.2 (pH=5.3); 11.4 (pH=4.4)
pK_{a}	6.4, 8.9	5.8, 7.1
octanol-water partition coefficient (XlogP)	4.8	–
topological polar surface area (TPSA)	71 Å²	–

=== Synthesis ===
Nirogacestat can be synthesised through the following pathway:

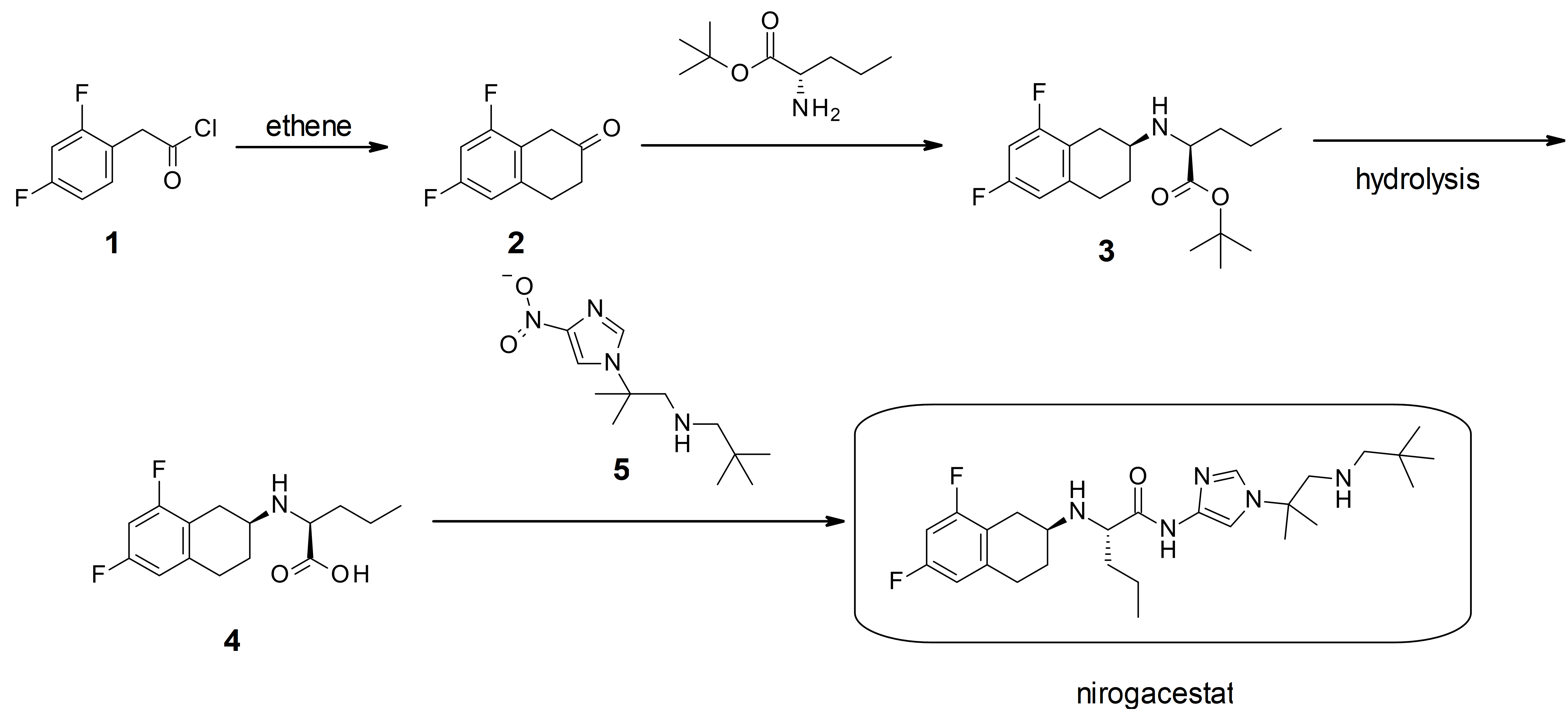
Nirogacestat synthesis

2-(2,4-difluorophenyl)acetyl chloride (1) undergoes cyclisation reaction with ethene to yield 2. Then, 2 reacts with tert-butyl (2S)-2-aminopentanoate, yielding 3 that is further hydrolysed to remove the tert-butyl group, yielding 4. To finally obtain nirogacestat, 4 is reacted with 5 ([1-[2-(2,2-dimethylpropylamino)-1,1-dimethyl-ethyl]imidazol-4-yl]azinate).

Alternatively, 6 reacts with 7, where the trifluoromethylsulfonate moiety acts as a leaving group and the tert-butyl moiety acts as a protecting group, to avoid the reaction of carboxyl group with amine group in 6. This reaction is performed in iso-propanol and an inorganic acid (such as hydrobromic or hydrochloric acid). Obtained 8 undergoes cyclisation reaction using 9 (1,1'-carbonyldiimidazole) in a polar aprotic solvent, yielding 10. Then, reaction with 11 creates nirogacestat.

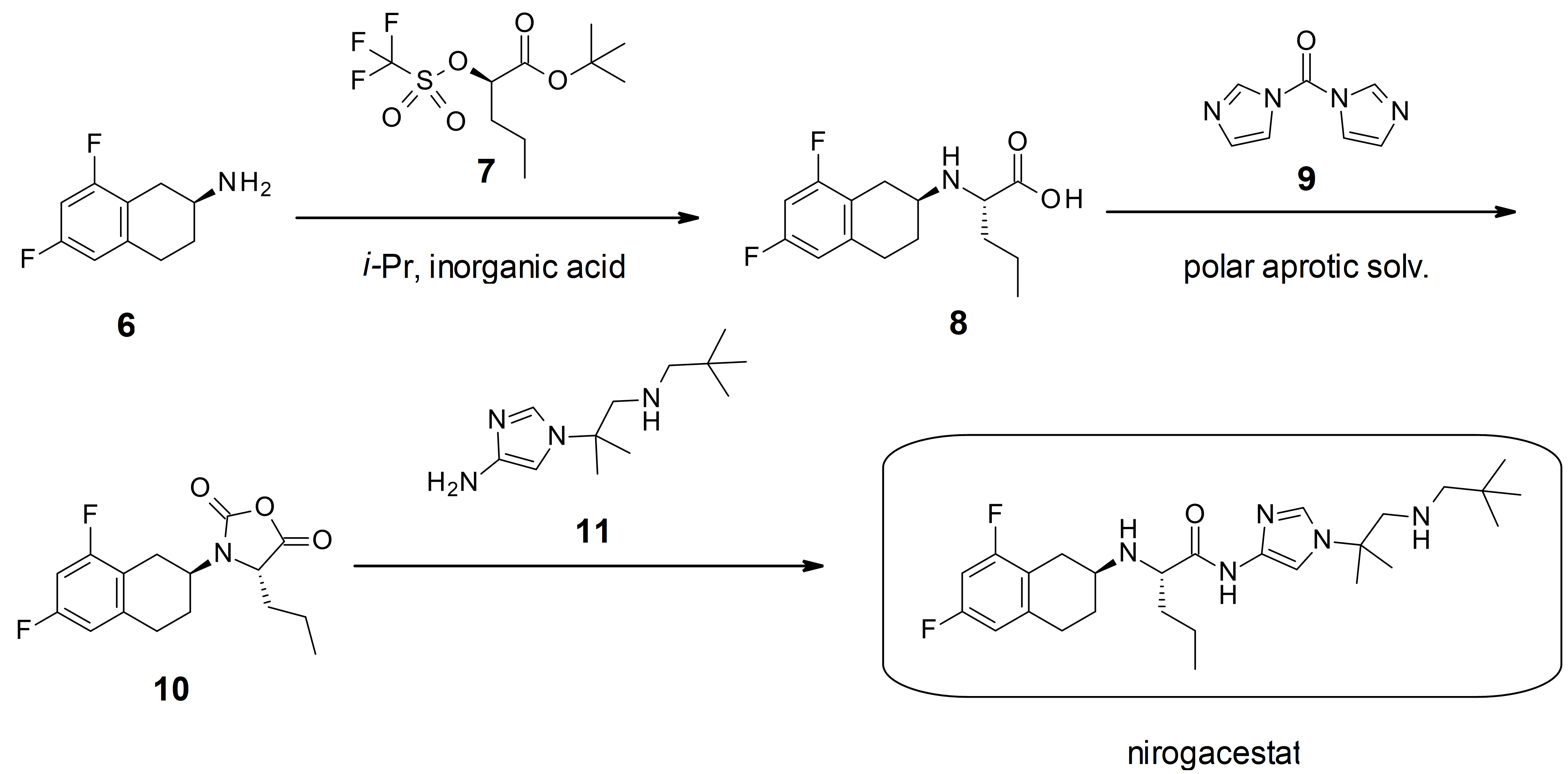
Alternative nirogacestat synthesis

The trifluoromethylsulfonyl group in 7 can be replaced with tert-butyloxycarbonyl group (Boc). Reaction of 10 with 11 is conducted a condensing agent, precisely O-(1,2-dihydro-2-oxo-pyridyl)-1,1,3,3-tetramethyluronium tetrafluoroborate (TPTU) in N,N-diisopropylethylamine.

Formation of several side products should be addressed. The above synthetic pathway allows to minimise side product creation to less than 1%. An important example is adverse cyclisation of the product of reaction of 10 with 11 shown below (compound 12). To avoid this situation, to the mixture of 10 and 11, compound 6 and hydrobromic acid is added.

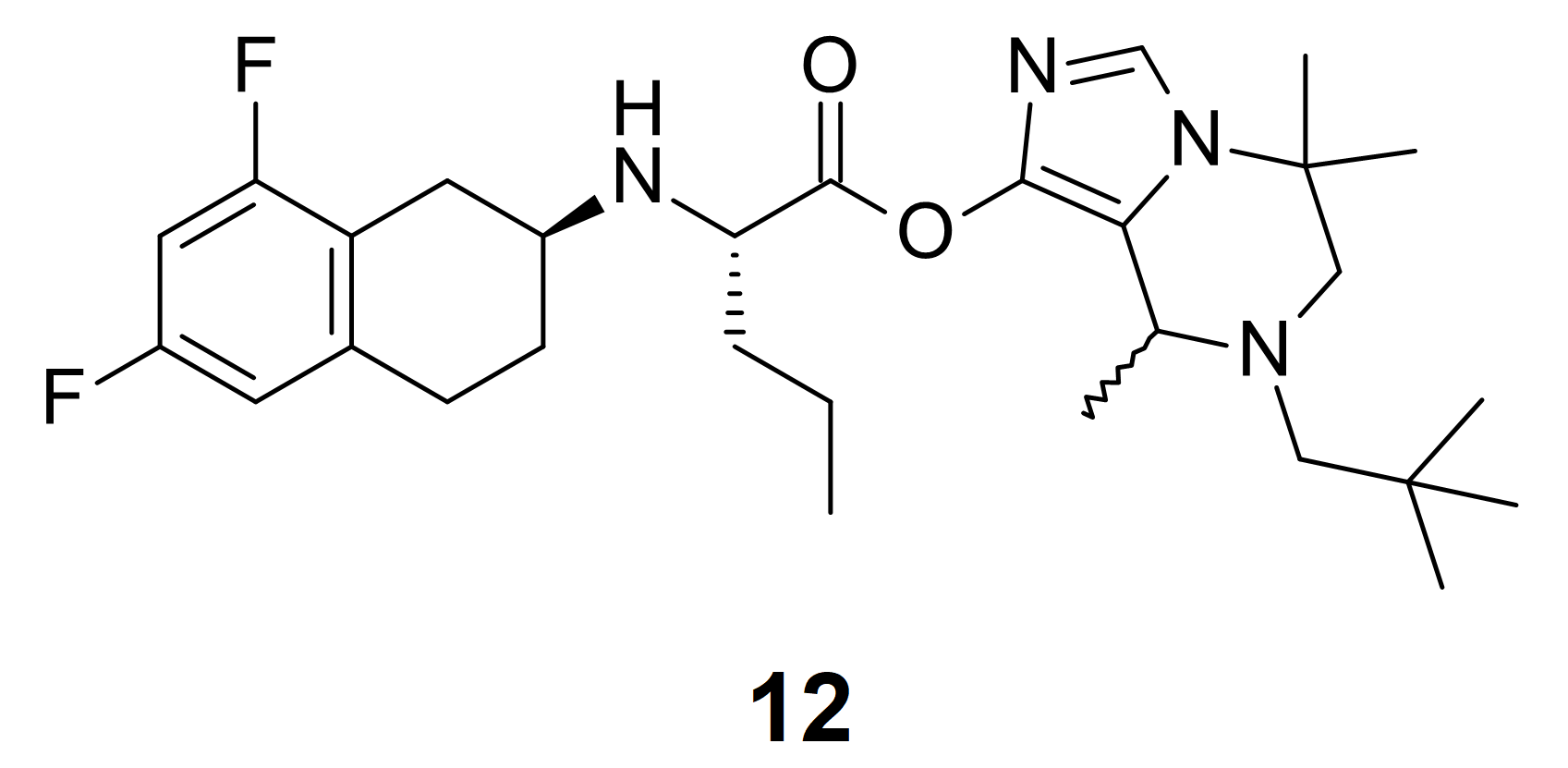
Side product – compound 12

Compounds 5 and 11 can be synthesised as follows:

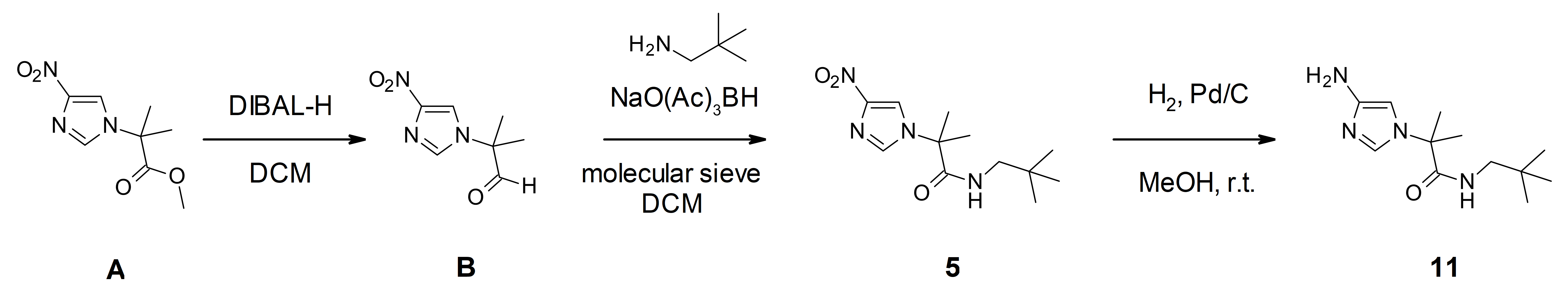
Compound 5 and 11 synthesis

A undergoes reduction using diisobutylaluminium hydride (DIBAL-H) in dichloromethane (DCM), obtaining B. Then B is condensed with 2,2-dimethylpropan-1-amine with Na(OAc)_{3}BH in DCM on a molecular sieve, yielding 5. To synthesise 11, 5 undergoes reduction with hydrogen on Pd/C in methanol.

Compound 6 and tert-butyl (2S)-2-aminopentanoate may be synthesised using an enzyme-driven process, using respectively: ATA ω-transaminase with isopropylamine, pyridoxal phosphate, phosphoric acid and potassium hydroxide; alcohol dehydrogenase, glucose dehydrogenase, glucose monohydrate, NAD^{+} in phosphate buffer and glycerol. This enzymatic process is used to obtain 6 from 2 while minimising stereoisomer side products (the reaction is selective towards the S isomer).

=== Crystalline forms ===
Nirogacestat can exist in several crystalline forms, where the form used clinically is an anhydrous dihydrobromide salt that has a primitive monoclinic Bravais lattice (form A). It exhibits high polymorphic purity of at least 80%. In water, it crystallises as small needles and does not change its lattice, suggesting stability. Other forms can change into form A in methanol, suggesting instability. However, form A in methanol mixed with other reagents (acetone, trichloromethane, methyl-tert-butyl ether and N-Methyl-2-pyrrolidone) changes its lattice. In clinical settings, this transformation is not observed.

Form A characteristics
Powder X-ray diffraction pattern	2θ = 8.8°, 9.8°, 23.3°	
Melting point	254 °C	
Unit cell	a = 10.035 Å, b= 7.532 Å, c = 20.092 Å	
Unit cell	volume = 1518.1 Å	
Particle size	volumetric median diameter	0.5-15 μm
Particle size	volumetric diameter of 90% of particles	2-30 μm
Particle size	volume-weighted mean diameter	5-200 μm

== History ==
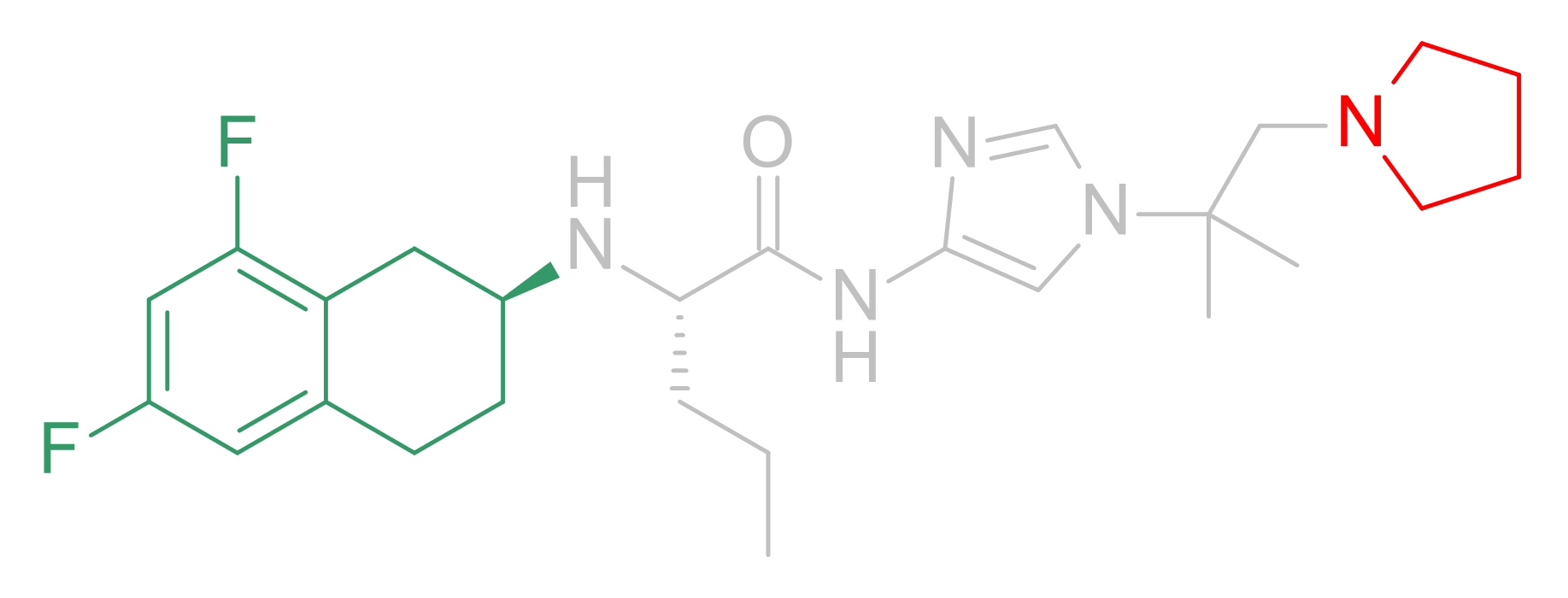
N-pyrrolidine pre-clinical compound leading to nirogacestat's discovery

Preclinical studies assessed different functional group configurations of a compound with a common backbone. Initially, N-pyrrolidine was selected for in vivo assay, which demonstrated significant inhibitory activity at gamma-secretase. Further studies aimed to optimise EC_{50}-plasma concentration coefficient, which led to selection of nirogacestat for further studies.

The effectiveness of nirogacestat was evaluated in DeFi (NCT03785964), an international, multicenter, randomized (1:1), double-blind, placebo-controlled trial in 142 adult participants with progressing desmoid tumors not amenable to surgery. Participants were randomized to receive 150 milligrams (mg) of nirogacestat or placebo orally, twice daily, until disease progression or unacceptable toxicity. The main efficacy outcome measure was progression-free survival (the length of time after the start of treatment for which a person is alive and their cancer does not grow or spread). Objective response rate (a measure of tumor shrinkage) was an additional efficacy outcome measure. The pivotal clinical trial demonstrated that nirogacestat provided clinically meaningful and statistically significant improvement in progression-free survival compared to placebo. Additionally, the objective response rate was also statistically different between the two arms with a response rate of 41% in the nirogacestat arm and 8% in the placebo arm. The progression-free survival results were also supported by an assessment of patient-reported pain favoring the nirogacestat arm.

As of 2021, nirogacestat was in phase II clinical trials for unresectable desmoid tumors. In addition, a phase III clinical trial, DeFi, was in progress for nirogacestat for adults with desmoid tumors and aggressive fibromatosis.

The FDA granted the application for nirogacestat priority review, fast track, breakthrough therapy, and orphan drug designations. The FDA granted the approval of Ogsiveo to SpringWorks Therapeutics Inc.

== Society and culture ==
=== Legal status ===
Nirogacestat was granted breakthrough therapy designation by the FDA in September 2019, for adults with progressive, unresectable, recurrent or refractory desmoid tumors or deep fibromatosis.

In June 2025, the Committee for Medicinal Products for Human Use of the European Medicines Agency adopted a positive opinion, recommending the granting of a marketing authorization for the medicinal product Ogsiveo, intended for the treatment of adults with progressing desmoid tumors. The applicant for this medicinal product is SpringWorks Therapeutics Ireland Limited. Nirogacestat was authorized for medical use in the European Union in August 2025.

== Research ==
=== Neurological disorders ===
Since gamma-secretase inhibitors are involved in producing amyloid β-peptide from amyloid precursor protein (APP), they may have application in the treatment of Alzheimer's disease. Nirogacestat tested in guiena pig brain showed amyloid β-lowering activity with ED_{50} for amyloid β in guiena pig brain at 1.83 mg/kg, sc. Another study showed, that IC_{50} values for cell-free enzyme assay (amyloid β_{1-40}), whole-cell assay (amyloid β_{1-x}) and CD25+ B- and T- cells in fetal thymic organ culture are respectively 6.2 nM, 1.2 nm and 1.3 nM.

However, human phase II clinical tria of nirogacestatl showed no benefit in altering APP processing by nirogacestat.

Nirogacestat may be useful for treating several other neurological diseases, including hereditary cerebral hemorrhage with amyloidosis, cerebral amyloid angiopathy, inclusion body myositis, multiple sclerosis, mild cognitive impairment and Down's syndrome.

=== Hematological malignancies ===
==== Multiple myeloma ====
Five clinical trials evaluated efficacy of nirogacestat with other anticancer therapies in multiple myeloma:

- UNIVERSAL – nirogacestat and allogeneic CAR-T therapy ALLO-715.
- MajesTEC-2 – nirogacestat an teclistamab
- DREAMM 5 – nirogacestat in combination with belantamab mafodotin and pomalidomide Results showed moderate response rate and allowed reduction of belantamab dose. One important advese effect associated with this treatment regimen were ocular events, including keratopathy, decreased corrected visual acuity. DREAMM-5 clinical trial confirmed these findings.
- MagnetisMM-4 – nirogacestat and elranatamab
- PBCAR269A – nirogacestat and allogenic anit-BCMA CAR-T cell therapy, fludarabine and cyclophosphamide (terminated due to insufficient therapeutic effect.)

Additionally, an in vitro and in vivo (plasma cells in healthy patients) study showed that nirogacestat rapidly increases membrane-bound BCMA receptor and decreases soluble BCMA concentrations, which in turn supports its potential to treat multiple myeloma. However, this effect was only temporary, suggesting that a steady sate is required to maintain its efficacy. Moreover, release of soluble BCMA into tear fluid is associated with keratopathy.

==== Lymphoblastic leukemia and T-cell lymphoblastic lymphoma ====
A clinical trial testing nirogacestat's usefulness in treating lymphoblastic malignancies was conducted and its results showed that it inhibited HES4 gene expression in peripheral blood of treated patients. Since this transcription factor is involved in Notch1-mediated T-cell development, this finding justifies further clinical trials to test its efficacy in blood cancers. In vitro studies in Notch1-mutated acute lymphoblastic leukemia cell lines confirmed HES4-inhibition and also presented evidence for decereasing expression of cMyc regulator. Moreover, nirogacestat induced apoptosis markers, that is the active form of caspase-3 and cleaved (inactivated) PARP expression in human acute lymphoblastic leukemia cells.

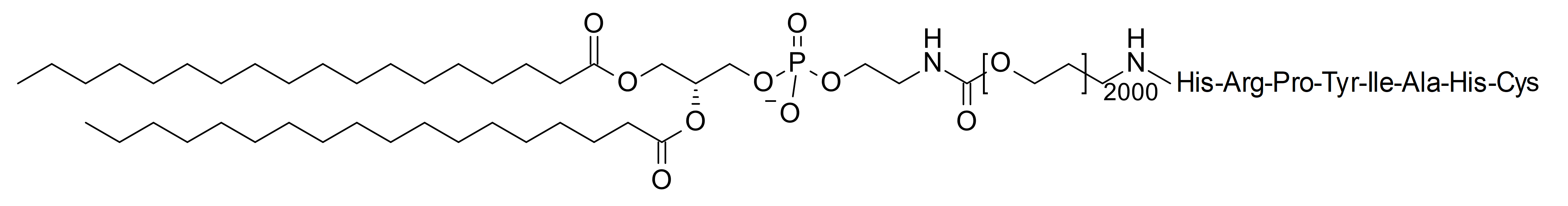
DSPE-PEG(2000)-DT7

One study tested a novel formulation of nirogacestat and dexamethasone, which were developed to be bound to a modified lecithin nanoparticles, targeting lymphoma cells. In vitro, this allowed to enhance dexamethasone-mediated cell death, through simultaneous glucocorticoid receptor hyperexpression and BCL2 inhibition. It also allowed to increase bone marrow accumulation. The peptide was synthesized from phopsphatidyletholamine bound to stearic acid chains and a pegyl group, an octapeptide (N-His-Arg-Pro-Tyr-Ile-Ala-His-Cys-C) and soy lecithin.

==== Chronic lymphoblastic leukemia ====
HG3 cell line represents a testing environment for drugs that affect the progression of chronic lymphoblastic leukemia. Nirogacestat is capable of decrease the viability of these cells (using ATP quantification assay) compared to DMSO in both NOTCH1 wild-type and mutated cells (using CRISPR/Cas9 technology), suggesting a probable treatment regimen for this disease. When combined with a USP28 (ubiquitin specific peptidase 28) allosteric inhibition, this regimen was enhanced compared to nirogacestat alone. Both of these findings were statistically significant.

Moreover, nirogacestat showed dose-dependent S and G_{2}-M mitotic phase inhibition in Notch1-mutated CLL cells, lowering cell viability.

==== Diffuse large B-cell lymphoma ====
Mutations in NOTCH2 genes in diffuse large-B cell lymphoma (DLBCL) can cause a relatively common resistance to R-CHOP treatment regimen. Nirogacestat promotes ubiquitin-dependent Notch2 degradation via E3 ligases (KLHL6 and FBXW7), stopping mRNA expression of MYC and KRAS genes, which are involved in downstream signalling leading to cell proliferation. Moreover, combination with an AKT inhibitor ipatasertib further enhanced apoptotic promotion in malignant R-CHOP-resistant lymphocytes B. However, the inhibitory constant (IC_{50}) of nirogacestat in dual KLHL6 and FBXW7 human DLBCL-xenotransplanted mutant mice (with a deletion in degron sites in E3 ligases, that recognise Notch2) was over two-times higher, than in the wild type.

==== Acute myeloid leukemia ====
Nirogacestat's chemoresistance reversion in combination in glasdegib was tested in three in vitro models, each representing a different subtype of acute myeloid leukemia (HL60 – AML M2 with TP53 deletion and CDKN2A^{C238T}, Kasumi-1 – AML M2 with AML1-ETO fusion gene and OCI-AML3 – AML M4 with NPM1 and DNMT3A^{R882c} mutations) as well as a small pool of patient samples. The results were mixed, where in HL60 cells this combination both reversed quiescence and decreased viability with addition of cytarabine than cytarabine alone. In OCI-AML3 and patient samples, only quiescence reversion was observed, whereas in Kasumi-1 – no differences were found.

Reverse transcriptase PCR assay found that nirogacestat in combination with dexamethasone significantly influenced expression of Notch-related genes (increased: DTX1 – an ubiquitin ligase, decreasing T-cell development in thymus, peripheral blood and spleen, BCL2L11 – a protein involved in Bcl-2-related apoptosis; decreased: HES1 – a transcription factor repressing NR3C1 glucocorticoid receptor upregulation). This finding shows that nirogacestat poses an ability to reverse glucocorticoid resistance in AML, thereby significantly decreasing tumor mass. Moreover, glucocorticoid administration attenuated nirogacestat-induced gastrointestinal toxicity, by stopping goblet cell metaplasia related to Notch1 suppression, and increasing Math1 gene. Nirogacestat also decreases β-actin expression, disrupting cytosceletal structures. Additionally, nirogacestat treatment exhibits synergistics effects with rapamycin's antileukemic properties.

==== Splenic marginal zone lymphoma ====
In vitro studies showed that concomitant nirogacestat administration with decitabine, ibrutinib, idelalisib, and an investigational drug 3-dezaneplanocin A intensively increased cell death in splenic marginal zone malignant lymphocytes.

=== Solid tumors ===
==== Colorectal cancer ====
In mouse with colorectal cancer harboring mutated adenomatous polyposis coli gene (APC), that exhibit enhanced Notch signalling, nirogacestat decreased cell migration, invasion and growth.

==== Pancreatic adenocarcinoma ====
One study tested nirogacestat alone and with gemcitabine in pancreatic ductal adenocarcinoma patient-derived xenografts in mice and showed that both treatment arms showed regression of cell division and decreased angiogenesis.

Phase II clinical trial of nirogacestat in metastatic pancreatic cancer was terminated due to changes in Pfizer's strategy in drug development.

Venous thromboembolism is a serious complication of panceratic cancer that is mediated by interleukin-6 (IL-6), thyroid peroxidase (TPO) and tissue factor (TF) secretion from tumor-associated stromal cells. Nirogacestat, in an in vivo study with mice injected with pancreatic adenocarcinoma cells, showed a steep decrease in these markers. This hyperexpression is also present in human plasma in patients with this malignancy. This effect was shown to be mediated by Jagged-Notch interaction.

==== Lung adenocarcinoma ====
Nirogacestat was shown to reverse resistance to tyrosine kinase inhibitors such as gefitinib in EGFR-mutated lung adenocarcinoma, precisely the form where there exists an EGFR^{T790M/L858R} mutation.

==== Breast cancer ====
Nirogacestat emerged as a possible adjunctive treatment to taxane treatment of triple-negative breast cancer. Notch receptor intracytoplasmic domain being internalized into a singnal-receiving cell, induces a signal transduction pathway associated with pregnane X receptor that causes BCRP, P-glycoprotein and CYP3A4 activation, causing drug resistance. It has a slight preference towards persenilin 2 versus 1 catalytic subunits of gamma-secretase.

Nirogacestat's chemoresistance reversion in combination in glasdegib was tested in three in vitro models, each representing a different subtype of acute myeloid leukemia (HL60 – AML M2 with TP53 deletion and CDKN2A^{C238T}, Kasumi-1 – AML M2 with AML1-ETO fusion gene and OCI-AML3 – AML M4 with NPM1 and DNMT3A^{R882c} mutations) as well as a small pool of patient samples. The results were mixed, where in HL60 cells this combination both reversed quiescence and decreased viability with addition of cytarabine than cytarabine alone. In OCI-AML3 and patient samples, only quiescence reversion was observed, whereas in Kasumi-1 – no differences were found.

Reverse transcriptase PCR assay found that nirogacestat in combination with dexamethasone significantly influenced expression of Notch-related genes (increased: DTX1 – an ubiquitin ligase, decreasing T-cell development in thymus, peripheral blood and spleen, BCL2L11 – a protein involved in Bcl-2-related apoptosis; decreased: HES1 – a transcription factor repressing NR3C1 glucocorticoid receptor upregulation). This finding shows that nirogacestat poses an ability to reverse glucocorticoid resistance in AML, thereby significantly decreasing tumor mass. Moreover, glucocorticoid administration attenuated nirogacestat-induced gastrointestinal toxicity, by stopping goblet cell metaplasia related to Notch1 suppression, and increasing Math1 gene. Nirogacestat also decreases β-actin expression, disrupting cytosceletal structures. Additionally, nirogacestat treatment exhibits synergistics effects with rapamycin's antileukemic properties.

In human mitoxantrone-resistant breast carcinoma cell line nirogacestat inhibits their migration, but shows no antiproliferative effects.

In estrogen receptor-positive metastatic breast cancer, a phase I study showed that co-administration of nirogacestat with exemestane inhibited metastasis.

Since angiogenesis associated with tumor development is regulater by YAP/TAZ cytoplasm translocation from nucleus, nirogacestat was tested as a possible inhibitor of cytoplasm transport of these transcription factors. In one study, it was shown that nirogacestat significantly reduced cytoplasmatic concentration of YAP and TAZ, suggesting antiangiogenic activity in breast cancer tumor environment.

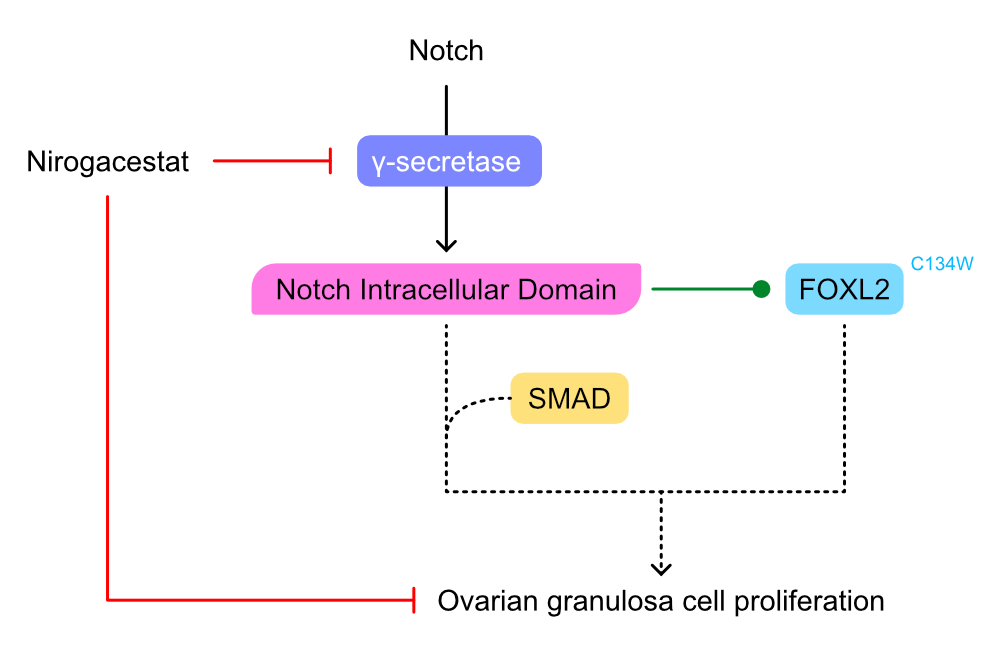
Nirogacestat's inhibitory effect on SMAD interaction with intracellular domain cleaved by γ-secretase and FOXL2 expression

==== Ovarian granulosa cell tumor ====
Similarly to abovementioned diseases, the mechanism of action of nirogacestat supported the launch of a phase 2 clinical trial. Proposed influence of nirogacestat on these tumors is that overactivation of Notch causes FOXL2 hyperexpression, which is inhibited by this drug. It was confirmed by studying nirogacestat's effect on a cell line, in which a mutation in FOXL2^{C134W} is present that causes enhanced gamma-secretase activity on SMAD-mediated signalling pathway. However, nirogacestat's usefulness in this model is controversial, since some studies show no clinical benefit.

==== Prostate cancer ====
In vitro studies of nirogacestat in castration-resistant prostate cancer cells showed, that it reversed enzalutamide and docetaxel resistance and itself halted the further development of cancerous malignancy. In PTEN-deficient cancer cells, nirogacestat induced tumor growth arrest by inducing cellular senescence.

==== Hepatocellular carcinoma and squamous cell carcinoma ====
Nirogacestat has the ability of suppressing hepatocellular carcinoma growth and metastasis, by decreasing Stat3 and Akt signalling activity beside Notch1 inhibition. Concomitant administration of sorafenib further decreased hepatocellular carcinoma spheroids (stem-like cells), where this effect is attributed to nirogacestat's ability to reduce Notch1-induced sorafenib resistance via decreasing epithelial-mesenchymal transition (EMT), where it is associated with attenuated expression of EMT-related genes (i.e., Snail1, N-cadherin, ABCG2, Nanog and Oct4), enhanced expression of E-cadherin and inhibition of survival signalling pathways (Mek/Erk and PI3K/Akt). It also reduced tumor angiogenesis in vivo.

Similar mechanisms are responsible for nirogacestat/erlotinib combination's ability to reduce head and neck and oral squamous cell carcinoma cell invasion and tumor growth.

==== Melanoma ====
Notch signalling pathway increases MAPK pathway in uveal and cutaneous melanoma. Therefore, it can cause resistance to cobimetinib. In BRAF^{V600E} metastatic melanoma, nirogacestat was shown to inhibit resistance to therapy, whereas in GNAQ^{Q209L} uveal melanoma it diminished cancer cell migration. Overall, it was also shown to inhibit c-jun and Erk1/2 activation.

==== Cholangiocarcinoma ====
TAZ zinc finger containing transcription factors are involved in development of cholangiocarcinoma. Since its expression is increased indirectly by Notch pathway, nirogacestat may be a potential treatment for this disease. The mechanism explaining this potential application is that Notch induces METLL3 expression, that causes N-6-methyladenosine modification of TAZ mRNA, which causes its hyperexpression.

=== Other diseases ===
==== Osteolytic diseases ====
In vivo studies showed nirogacestat's activity at receptor activator of nuclear factor-κB ligand (RANKL), which is implicated in osteoclastogenesis and lipopolysaccharide-induced bone resorption. It inhibited bone resorption and attenuated mRNA expression of osteoclast-specific markers (calcitonin receptor, tartarate-resistant acid phosphatase, cathepsin K, dendritic cell-specific transmembrane protein, V-ATPase d2, nuclear factor of activated T-cells cytoplasmic 1).

==== Recessive dystrophic epidermolysis bullosa ====
Notch signalling pathway is involved in profibrotic activity, causing dystrophic epidermolysis bullosa. Nirogacestat can be a potential treatment for this disease, since it reduces fibroblast contractility and secretion of TGF-β1 and collagens.

==== Polycystic kidney disease ====
In one study, nirogacestat was an agent tested among other compounds, including another Notch inhibitor – dibenzazepine. Both of them were shown to inhibit forskolin-mediated Notch3 expression in ADPKD (Autosomal Dominant Polycystic Kidney Disease) cells.

==== Microvillus inclusion disease ====
Studies in mice pretreated with tamoxifen in order to create myosin Vb-deficient and -mutated intestinal epithelium cells showed that nirogacestat halted mislocalisation of enterocyte sodium transporters (e.g., sodium–hydrogen antiporter 3 and sodium/glucose cotransporter 1) only in deficient, but not mutated, mice tissues. Even though this study was not aimed at utilising nirogacestat as a potential treatment, it showed that total loss and malfunction of myosin Vb contribute to different subtypes of microvillus inclusion disease.

==== Retinal degenerative diseases ====
Transplantation of retinal organoids derived from human embryonic stem cells and induced pluripotent stem cells in conjunction with nirogacestat administration in mice presenting with retinal degeneration increased both rod and cone generation in the retina. However, this process is highly inefficient, since most of the transplanted cells undergo apoptosis, outflow from the injection site, graft rejection and produce inflammatory response.

==== Diabetes ====
Concomitant administration of nirogacestat and a FOXO1 inhibitor in streptozocin-induced diabetic mice was shown to increase enteroendocrine progenitor cells differentiation into β-cells, which secrete insulin, thereby decreasing plasma glucose concentration. This effect influenced hepatic glucose homeostasis, by increasing the expression of glucokinase (consequently inducing glycogen synthesis), and suppressing gluconeogenic enzymes glucose-6-phosphatase and phosphoenolpyruvate carboxykinase expression.

=== Analogs ===
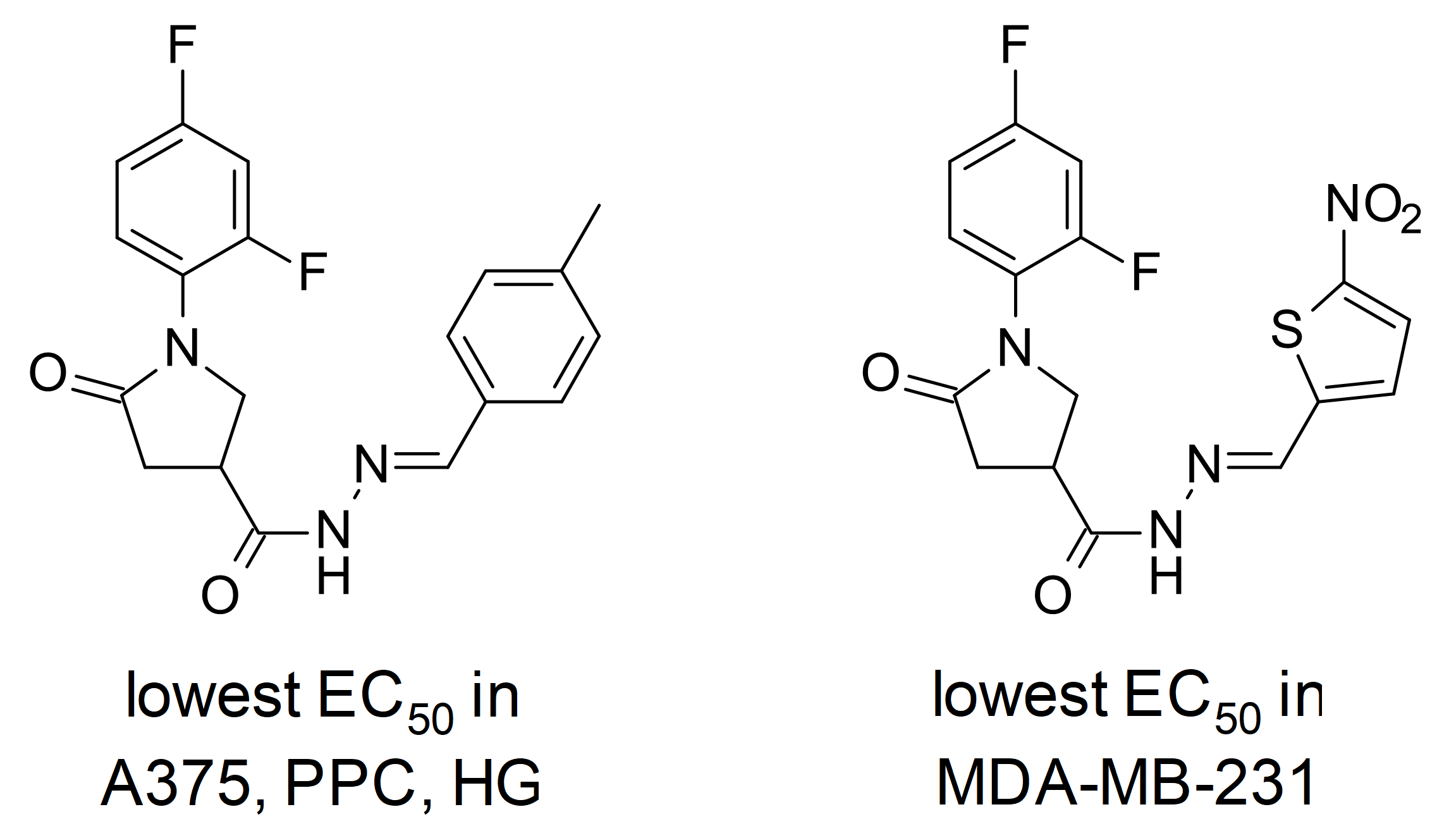
2,4-difluorophenyl derivatives (A375 – melanoma cell line, MDA-MB-231 – triple-negative breast cancer cell line, PCC-1 – prostate adenocarcinoma cell line, HF – human fibroblasts)

The 2,4-difluorophenyl moiety of nirogacestat exhibits strongly polarised carbon-fluorine bonds; therefore it can create hydrogen bonds with biological targets. This characteristic led to development of novel molecules that can be utilised in treatment of several cancers. Their structure is based on 1-(2,4-difluorophenyl)-5-oxopyrrolidine-3-carboxylic acid, which is conjugated with other moieties. Smallest EC_{50} values were shown for following compounds.
