= Desmoid Tumor Research Foundation =

American rare disease research nonprofit

- Abbreviation: DTRF
- Formation: 2005
- Type: Non-profit organization
- Tax ID no.: 61-1493017
- Purpose: Research for desmoid tumors
- Location: United States
- Website: www.dtrf.org

The Desmoid Tumor Research Foundation (DTRF) is an American non-profit organization which funds research on desmoid tumors (aggressive fibromatosis), a rare soft-tissue tumor affecting 5–6 people per million per year. Its goal is to improve treatments and find a cure. The organization was founded in 2005 by Marlene Portnoy and Jeanne Whiting after Portnoy's husband and Whiting were diagnosed with desmoid tumors. The Desmoid Tumor Research Foundation is the only American foundation dedicated to desmoid tumor research.

It is a member of the National Organization for Rare Disorders (NORD), the Sarcoma Coalition, and partners with the National Cancer Institute's My Pediatric and Adult Rare Tumor (MyPART) Network.

The Desmoid Tumor Research Foundation helped spearhead trials of nirogacestat for use in desmoid patients. Its advocacy led to the creation of desmoid-specific ICD-10-CM disease codes in 2023. The organization has also established a patient registry along with NORD.
