= Artificial iris =

Type of intraocular implant

An artificial iris is an intraocular implant (implant inside the eye) that is used as both a cosmetic and to treat those with aniridia (missing or damaged irises) or other eye trauma. People with this condition experience photophobia, or increased sensitivity to light. The artificial iris, made from silicone, acts as a replacement iris. The artificial iris is implanted in the eye using different surgery techniques depending on the patient's eye trauma. Most of the major artificial iris manufacturers are European and the treatment is used sparingly in the United States because of limited FDA approval, in part due to possibility of vision loss and other risks.

== Medical function ==
The iris controls how much light enters the eye, so if a person has a damaged iris or lacks an iris (aniridia), they can experience large amounts of glare from normal daylight. They may also have other visual disturbances such as seeing arcs or halos. Implanting an artificial iris allows the patient's eye to regulate light. After implantation, patients saw an improvement in overall visual acuity, contrast sensitivity, depth of focus, and a decrease in perceived glare.

The artificial iris treats those who were born with aniridia or who have experienced eye trauma that lead to a damaged iris, such as a complication from eye surgeries like ruptured globe repair. It is only recommended to get surgical implants if the patient has aphakic (absence of lens) or pseudophakic (artificial lens) eyes. The artificial iris is an alternative to eyepatches, sunglasses, or blackout contact lenses.

== Cosmetic function ==
Artificial irises may be implanted into people with healthy eyes to change their eye color. These cosmetic irises are marketed as an alternative to cosmetic contact lenses. Cosmetic implants are criticized by ophthalmologists as they can lead to vision loss in healthy eyes.

== Use ==
Each artificial iris is custom-made for the patient's eye, using an image of their undamaged iris, or any other iris as reference. Artificial irises are made from silicone or other polymer matrix composites into a disk shape with a hole in the middle. Encased inside, is the color design. Before implantation, the iris' size is adjusted to fit the eye. The implants can be made with a tough fiber mesh so that they can be sewn onto a damaged iris. When there is no iris to attach to, the implants are made without the mesh to be more flexible to adapt to the eye's shape.

The artificial iris is implanted in the area of the eye behind the iris and in front of the ciliary body (what focuses your eye) in an area called the ciliary sulcus. Multiple techniques can be used to implant artificial irises that involve the use of forceps, injector systems, and suturing. The artificial iris is folded and placed in a cartridge on the side of the injector that is then injected into the ciliary sulcus like a syringe. All operations are performed with the patient under general anesthesia.

=== Segment-shaped artificial iris implantation ===
When only part of the iris is damaged, surgeons cut the artificial iris into a segment that covers the damaged area. The segment is folded and inserted into a clear corneal incision using an injector or forceps. That segment is then unfolded and sutured to the damaged iris.

=== Complete artificial iris implantation ===
When the patient has complete aniridia, the artificial iris can be folded and inserted through a corneal or scleral incision via an injector system or forceps. After the iris is unfolded, it does not need to be sutured. This version of the artificial iris is more flexible and will adapt to the shape of the eye.

== Complications ==
- In some cases, patients with partial aniridia saw their original iris tissue darkened and no longer matched the color of the artificial iris.
- Patients who received the segmented implants made of mesh had a higher chance of developing glaucoma, keratopathy (corneal disease), and iris hemorrhages. These are likely caused by the sharp mesh fibers that can cut or irritate the surrounding tissues.
- The most common complication is an increase in eye pressure. The patient is given a topical treatment.
- Following the surgery, the artificial iris may become misaligned or partially dislocated. This happens when the sutures become loose or if the patient had previous eye trauma around the implantation site that makes the implant fit loosely. The implant is realigned and given a new suture.

== Artificial Iris as a Silicone Oil Diaphragm ==
To prevent hemorrhaging of the eye, ophthalmologists use silicone oil as a tamponade (block bleeding). The oil surrounds the eye and it is viscous enough to prevent bleeding. Some patients who have eye trauma require a long-term silicone oil tamponade. To prevent the silicone oil from touching the cornea and causing corneal dystrophy, a diaphragm made of polymethylacrylate (PMMA) is installed to seal the area around the cornea. For patients needing a long-term silicone oil tamponade, it is possible to implant an artificial iris that will act as this diaphragm while also appearing as a natural iris. However, if the patient's eyes are hypotonic (have low pressure), there is still a chance of silicone oil breaching the diaphragm.

== History ==
- In the 1960s, the first prosthetic iris was developed by Peter Choyce. It was made of PMMA and tended to cause glaucoma and corneal failure.
- In 1991, Sudenmacher et al and Morcher GMBH created a larger prosthetic iris made of PMMA with a black outer diaphragm that required a large incision.
- In 1996, Volker Rasch and Morcher's injectable prosthetic iris was implanted. It utilized a capsular tension ring to lock the iris into place.
- Ophtec created a prosthetic iris that required smaller incisions to be implanted and was available in colors other than black.
- In the early 2000s, HumanOptics and Hans Reinhard Koch started to design a foldable and customizable iris made out of silicone.
- In 2018, the HumanOptics CustomFlex Artificial Iris received regulatory approval from the FDA, becoming the first and only artificial iris to be cleared in the United States.
