= PAX6 =

Protein-coding gene in humans

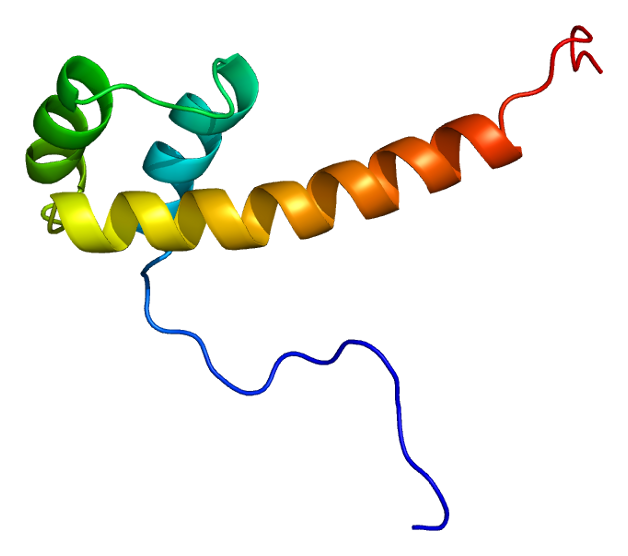

Identifiers
- Aliases: PAX6, AN, AN2, D11S812E, FVH1, MGDA, WAGR, paired box 6, ASGD5
- External IDs: OMIM: 607108; MGI: 97490; GeneCards: PAX6
Available structures
PDB	Ortholog search: PDBe RCSB
PDB	List of PDB id codes 2CUE, 6PAX

Gene location (Human)
Chr.	Chromosome 11 (human)
Band	11p13	Start	31,784,779 bp
Band	11p13	End	31,818,062 bp

Gene location (Mouse)
Chr.	Chromosome 2 (mouse)
Band	2 E3|2 55.31 cM	Start	105,499,245 bp
Band	2 E3|2 55.31 cM	End	105,527,709 bp
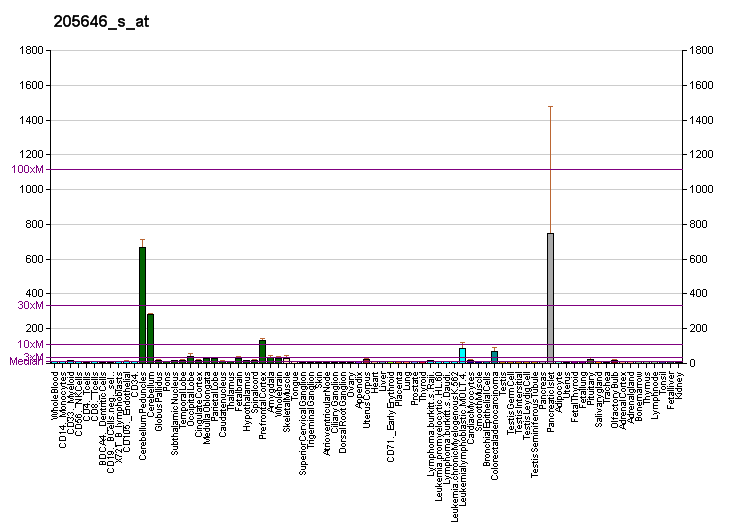
RNA expression pattern
Bgee	Human / Mouse (ortholog); Top expressed in: palpebral conjunctiva; ventricular zone; beta cell; paraflocculus of cerebellum; ganglionic eminence; cerebellar vermis; right hemisphere of cerebellum; pons; external globus pallidus; Region I of hippocampus proper / Top expressed in: neural layer of retina; corneal stroma; ventricular zone; lens; corneal epithelium; iris; epithelium of lens; islet of Langerhans; ciliary body; conjunctival fornix; More reference expression data
BioGPS	More reference expression data
Gene ontology
Molecular function	protein binding; DNA binding; sequence-specific DNA binding; ubiquitin-protein transferase activity; DNA-binding transcription activator activity, RNA polymerase II-specific; DNA-binding transcription repressor activity, RNA polymerase II-specific; chromatin binding; DNA-binding transcription factor activity; transcription factor binding; protein kinase binding; ubiquitin protein ligase binding; histone acetyltransferase binding; co-SMAD binding; R-SMAD binding; HMG box domain binding; RNA polymerase II cis-regulatory region sequence-specific DNA binding; RNA polymerase II core promoter sequence-specific DNA binding; DNA-binding transcription factor activity, RNA polymerase II-specific
Cellular component	cytoplasm; nucleus; nucleoplasm; cytosol; intracellular anatomical structure
Biological process	eye development; blood vessel development; animal organ morphogenesis; regulation of transcription, DNA-templated; glucose homeostasis; transcription, DNA-templated; central nervous system development; response to wounding; cell differentiation; cornea development in camera-type eye; negative regulation of neurogenesis; visual perception; iris morphogenesis; multicellular organism development; neuron fate commitment; protein ubiquitination; negative regulation of transcription by RNA polymerase II; establishment of mitotic spindle orientation; cell fate determination; neuron migration; negative regulation of protein phosphorylation; positive regulation of neuroblast proliferation; lens development in camera-type eye; regionalization; type B pancreatic cell differentiation; pancreatic A cell development; regulation of transcription by RNA polymerase II; transcription by RNA polymerase II; smoothened signaling pathway; axonogenesis; axon guidance; brain development; salivary gland morphogenesis; negative regulation of cell population proliferation; regulation of asymmetric cell division; dorsal/ventral axis specification; anterior/posterior pattern specification; dorsal/ventral pattern formation; regulation of gene expression; positive regulation of gene expression; pallium development; oligodendrocyte cell fate specification; cerebral cortex regionalization; forebrain dorsal/ventral pattern formation; commitment of neuronal cell to specific neuron type in forebrain; forebrain-midbrain boundary formation; telencephalon regionalization; pituitary gland development; habenula development; signal transduction involved in regulation of gene expression; keratinocyte differentiation; regulation of cell migration; positive regulation of epithelial cell differentiation; forebrain development; lacrimal gland development; protein localization to organelle; eye photoreceptor cell development; camera-type eye development; cell fate commitment; negative regulation of neuron differentiation; positive regulation of transcription, DNA-templated; positive regulation of transcription by RNA polymerase II; regulation of timing of cell differentiation; embryonic camera-type eye morphogenesis; astrocyte differentiation; negative regulation of epithelial cell proliferation; regulation of neurogenesis; retina development in camera-type eye; cellular response to leukemia inhibitory factor; negative regulation of neural precursor cell proliferation; positive regulation of core promoter binding
Sources:Amigo / QuickGO
Orthologs
Databases	NCBI: entry; OMA: entry
Species	Human	Mouse
Entrez	5080	18508
Ensembl	ENSG00000007372	ENSMUSG00000027168
UniProt	P26367	P63015
RefSeq (mRNA)	NM_000280; NM_001127612; NM_001258462; NM_001258463; NM_001258464 NM_001258465; NM_001310158; NM_001310159; NM_001310160; NM_001310161; NM_001604	NM_001244198; NM_001244200; NM_001244201; NM_001244202; NM_013627 NM_001310144; NM_001310145; NM_001310146
RefSeq (protein)	NP_000271; NP_001121084; NP_001245391; NP_001245392; NP_001245393 NP_001245394; NP_001297087; NP_001297088; NP_001297089; NP_001297090; NP_001595; NP_001355816; NP_001355817; NP_001355818; NP_001355819; NP_001355820; NP_001355821; NP_001355822; NP_001355823; NP_001355828; NP_001355829; NP_001355830; NP_001355831; NP_001355832; NP_001355833; NP_001355834; NP_001355835; NP_001355836; NP_001355837; NP_001355838; NP_001355839; NP_001355840; NP_001355841; NP_001355842; NP_001355843; NP_001355844; NP_001355845; NP_001355846; NP_001355847; NP_001355848; NP_001355849; NP_001355850; NP_001355851; NP_001355852; NP_001355853; NP_001355854; NP_001355855; NP_001355856; NP_001355857; NP_001355858; NP_001355859	NP_001231127; NP_001231129; NP_001231130; NP_001231131; NP_001297073 NP_001297074; NP_001297075; NP_038655
Location (UCSC)	Chr 11: 31.78 – 31.82 Mb	Chr 2: 105.5 – 105.53 Mb
PubMed search
- Wikidata
View/Edit Human	View/Edit Mouse

Paired box protein Pax-6, also known as aniridia type II protein (AN2) or oculorhombin, is a protein that in humans is encoded by the PAX6 gene.

== Function ==
PAX6 is a member of the Pax gene family which is responsible for carrying the genetic information that will encode the Pax-6 protein. It acts as a "master control" gene for the development of eyes and other sensory organs, certain neural and epidermal tissues as well as other homologous structures, usually derived from ectodermal tissues. However, it has been recognized that a suite of genes is necessary for eye development, and therefore the term of "master control" gene may be inaccurate. Pax-6 is expressed as a transcription factor when neural ectoderm receives a combination of weak Sonic hedgehog (SHH) and strong TGF-Beta signaling gradients. Expression is first seen in the forebrain, hindbrain, head ectoderm and spinal cord followed by later expression in midbrain. This transcription factor is most noted for its use in the interspecifically induced expression of ectopic eyes and is of medical importance because heterozygous mutants produce a wide spectrum of ocular defects such as aniridia in humans.

Pax6 serves as a regulator in the coordination and pattern formation required for differentiation and proliferation to successfully take place, ensuring that the processes of neurogenesis and oculogenesis are carried out successfully. As a transcription factor, Pax6 acts at the molecular level in the signaling and formation of the central nervous system. The characteristic paired DNA binding domain of Pax6 utilizes two DNA-binding domains, the paired domain (PD), and the paired-type homeodomain (HD). These domains function separately via utilization by Pax6 to carry out molecular signaling that regulates specific functions of Pax6. An example of this lies in HD's regulatory involvement in the formation of the lens and retina throughout oculogenesis contrasted by the molecular mechanisms of control exhibited on the patterns of neurogenesis in brain development by PD. The HD and PD domains act in close coordination, giving Pax6 its multifunctional nature in directing molecular signaling in formation of the CNS. Although many functions of Pax6 are known, the molecular mechanisms of these functions remain largely unresolved. High-throughput studies uncovered many new target genes of the Pax6 transcription factors during lens development. They include the transcriptional activator BCL9, recently identified, together with Pygo2, to be downstream effectors of Pax6 functions.

Post-translational regulation of PAX6 includes acetylation by KAT2A, which promotes its ubiquitination and proteasomal degradation, thereby influencing the balance between proliferation and neuronal differentiation in neural stem cells.

== Role in human fetal development ==
During human fetal development, PAX6 functions as a master regulatory transcription factor essential for the formation of several organ systems, particularly the eyes, central nervous system, and pancreas. In the developing human eye, PAX6 controls the differentiation and organization of critical structures including the lens, retina, and cornea, and is indispensable for initiating the genetic pathways required for proper ocular formation. Beyond its role in the eye, PAX6 plays a significant part in the patterning of the central nervous system by regulating the proliferation, migration, and specialization of neural progenitor cells during early brain development.

A notable aspect of PAX6's function in the human fetus is its involvement in the regionalization of the developing brain. It helps establish gradients of gene expression within the embryonic forebrain, guiding the formation of distinct cortical regions responsible for sensory, motor, and cognitive functions after birth. Although much of this understanding comes from experimental knockout studies in animal models, similar mutations in humans are associated with serious developmental abnormalities, including aniridia (absence of the iris) and brain malformations, further confirming PAX6's crucial role in human organ development and fetal patterning.

== Species distribution ==
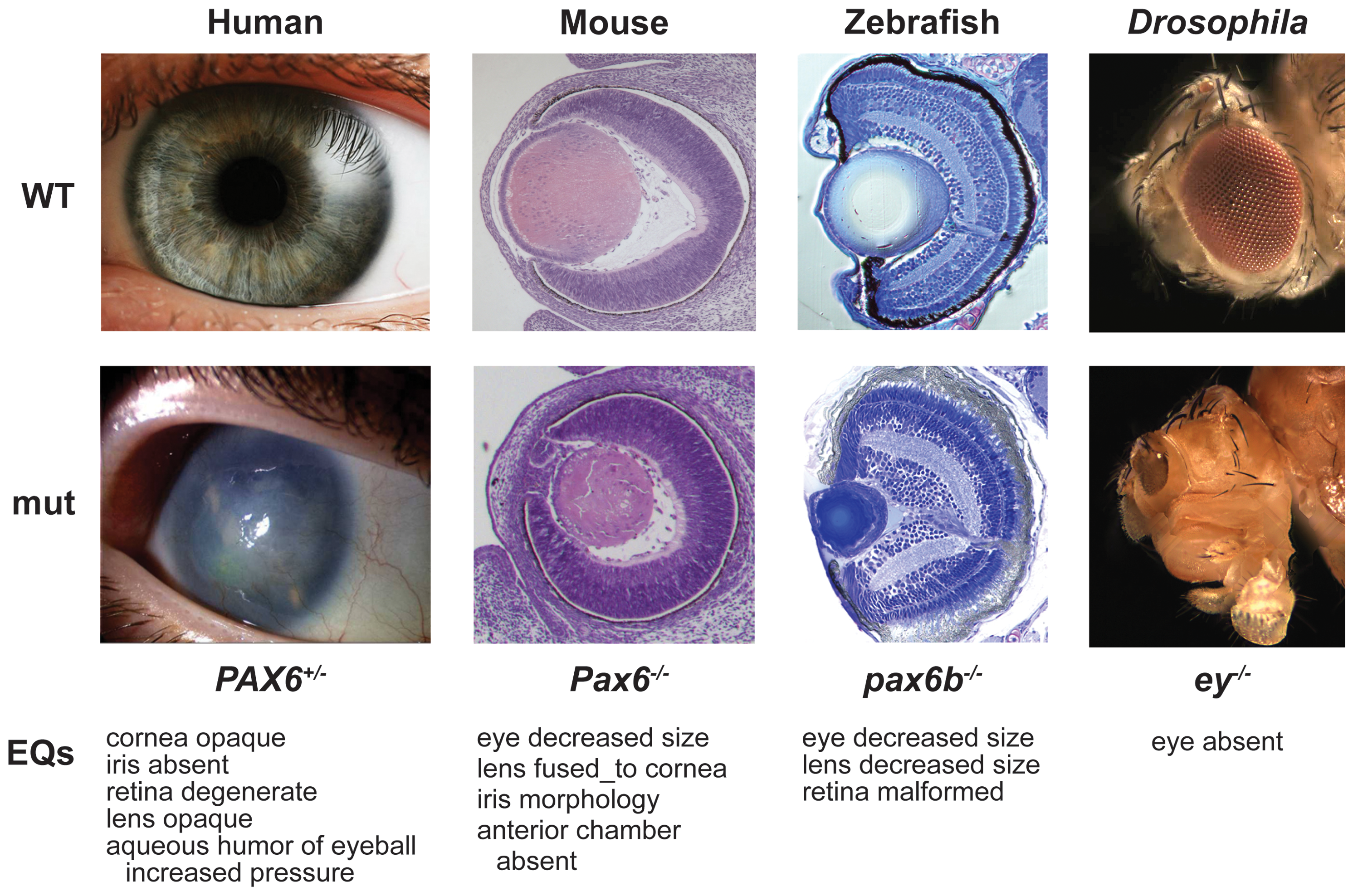
Pax6 alterations result in similar phenotypic alterations of eye morphology and function across a wide range of species.

PAX6 protein function is surprisingly conserved across bilaterian species. For instance, mouse Pax6 can trigger eye development in Drosophila melanogaster, despite insects and vertebrates having very different eyes (compound vs. camera). As a result, Pax6 is hailed as the prototypical example of deep homology, where structures that appear very different turn out to use homologous processes for their growth and development. In the case of Pax6 controlling the development of different form of eyes in insects, vertebrates, and cephalopods, further evidence suggest a case of parallel evolution from a primitive ancestral setup.

Genomic organisation of the PAX6 locus varies among species, including the number and distribution of exons, cis-regulatory elements, and transcription start sites, although most elements at the Vertebrata subphylum do line up with each other. The first work on genomic organisation was performed in quail, but the picture of the mouse locus is the most complete to date. This consists of 3 confirmed promoters (P0, P1, Pα), 16 exons, and at least 6 enhancers. The 16 confirmed exons are numbered 0 through 13 with the additions of exon α located between exons 4 and 5, and the alternatively spliced exon 5a. Each promoter is associated with its own proximal exon (exon 0 for P0, exon 1 for P1) resulting in transcripts which are alternatively spliced in the 5' un-translated region. By convention, exon for orthologs from other species are named relative to the human/mouse numbering, as long as the organization is reasonably well-conserved.

=== Vertebrates ===
The vertebrate PAX6 locus encodes at least three different protein isoforms, these being the canonical PAX6, PAX6(5a), and PAX6(ΔPD). The canonical PAX6 protein contains an N-terminal paired domain, connected by a linker region to a paired-type homeodomain, and a proline/serine/threonine (P/S/T)-rich C-terminal domain (PST). The paired domain and paired-type homeodomain each have DNA binding activities, while the variable length P/S/T-rich domain possesses a transactivation function, stretching to 153 residues in human and mouse versions.

PAX6(5a) is a product of the alternatively spliced exon 5a resulting in a 14 residue insertion in the PD which alters the specificity of this DNA binding activity. The 5a isoform plays a key role in postnatal iris formation and in maintaining the structure of the cornea, lens and retina.

The nucleotide sequence corresponding to the linker region encodes a set of three alternative translation start codons from which the third PAX6 isoform originates. Collectively known as the PAX6(ΔPD) or pairedless isoforms, these three gene products all lack a paired domain. The pairedless proteins possess molecular weights of 43, 33, or 32kDa, depending on the particular start codon used. The mouse ΔPD forms undergo sumoylation in embryonic optic and lens vesicles. Its DNA-binding and transcriptional activities differ from the canonical form.

The last common ancestor of living jawless and jawed vertebrates already had a camera-type lens eye, whereas other chordate groups do not have such an advanced eye (and in general no other group has an identically-structured camera eye), suggesting that vertebrates evolved this type of eye on their own. Nonetheless, gene expression analysis is able to find similarities in the genetic machinery used to build the amphioxus frontal eye to the ones used to build the vertebrate eye. Furthermore, amphioxus share additional similarities to the vertebrate eye (e.g. cilated photoreceptor cells, an off-responding phototransductory cascade) not shared by other forms of eyes.

=== Arthropods ===
Insects have at least four paralogous copies of Pax6 with diversification of their functions. Of the four Drosophila Pax6 orthologues, it is thought that the eyeless (ey) and twin of eyeless (toy) gene products share functional analogy with the vertebrate canonical Pax6 isoform, while the pairedless eyegone (eyg) and twin of eyegone (toe) gene products share functional analogy with the vertebrate Pax6(5a) isoform. Eyeless and eyegone were named for their respective mutant phenotypes. These paralogs also play a role in the development in the entire eye-antennal disc, and consequently in head formation. toy positively regulates ey expression.

Whereas vertebrates built up the regulative novelty required for eye formation through the development of alternative splicing sites, insects resorted to gene duplication and subsequent diversification. The functions of these genes are not fully conserved in insects: for example, toy and eyg have different functions in the eye formation of flies and beetles; and toy and ey have different functions in eye formation between honeybees and flies.

=== Cephalopods ===
Cephalopods such as squids have camera eyes in an orientation reverse to that of vertebrates. Unlike the cillary photoreceptors of chordates, cephalopods and insects use rhabdomeric (microvillar) photoreceptor cells. Like vertebrates (and unlike insects), squids independently acquired additional variants of Pax6 by alternative splicing. Although this does not directly explain how squids acquired camera eyes (or even how they develop), the acquisition of new isoforms again provided novelty in the regulation of gene expression by an old gene.

== Clinical significance ==
Experiments in mice demonstrate that a deficiency in Pax-6 leads to decrease in brain size, brain structure abnormality leading to autism, lack of iris formation or a thin cornea. Knockout experiments produced eyeless phenotypes reinforcing indications of the gene's role in eye development.

== Mutations ==
During embryological development the PAX6 gene, found on chromosome 2 in mice, can be seen expressed in multiple early structures such as the spinal cord, hindbrain, forebrain and eyes. Mutations of the PAX6 gene in mammalian species can produce a drastic effect on the phenotype of the organism. This can be seen in mice that contain homozygous mutations of the 422 amino acid long transcription factor encoded by PAX6 in which they do not develop eyes or nasal cavities termed 'small eye' mice (PAX10^{sey/sey}). Deletion of PAX6 induces the same abnormal phenotypes indicating that mutations cause the protein to lose functionality. PAX6 is essential is the formation of the retina, lens and cornea due to its role in early cell determination when forming precursors of these structures such as the optic vesicle and overlying surface ectoderm. PAX10 mutations also hinder nasal cavity development due to the similar precursor structures that in small eye mice do not express PAX10 mRNA. Mice lacking any functional PAX6 begin to be phenotypically differentiable from normal mouse embryos at about day 9 to 10 of gestation. The full elucidation of the precise mechanisms and molecular components by which the PAX6 gene influences eye, nasal and central nervous system development are still researched however, the study of PAX6 has brought more understanding to the development and genetic complexities of these mammalian body systems.

== See also ==
- Aniridia
- Gillespie syndrome
