= Aggressive fibromatosis =

Medical condition

- Other names: Desmoid tumor, deep fibromatosis, desmoid fibromatosis
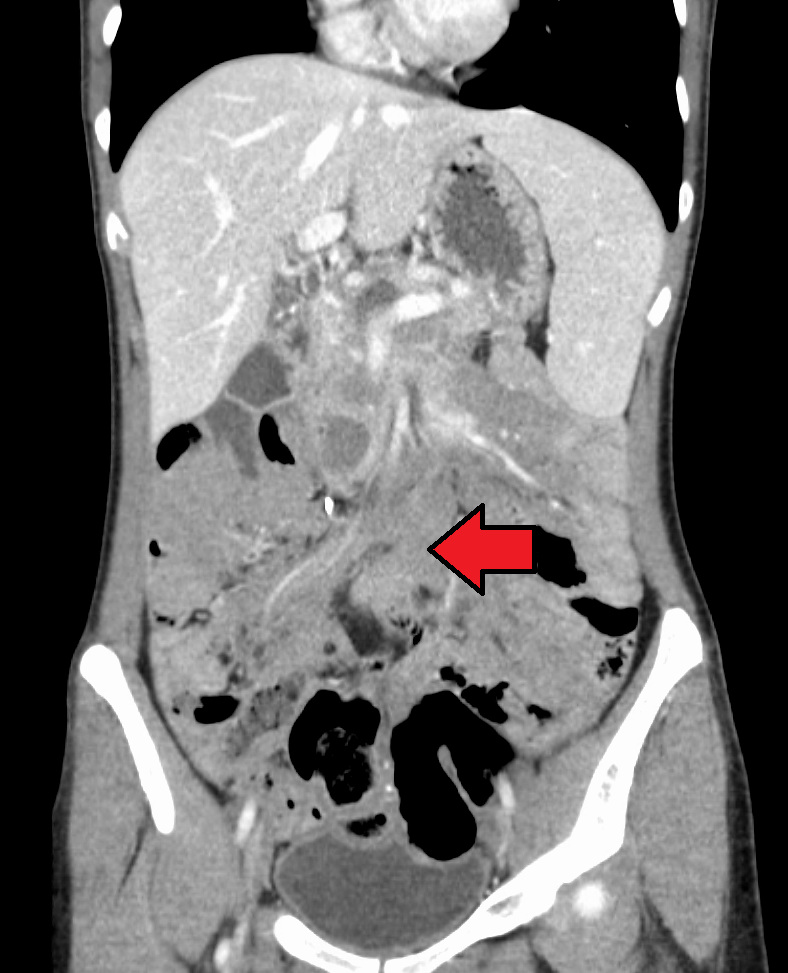
- Desmoid tumor as seen on CT scan
- Specialty: Oncology, surgery, radiology
- Complications: Pain, loss of function, restricted movement
- Usual onset: 30–40 years
- Risk factors: CTNNB1 and APC gene mutations, familial adenomatous polyposis, estrogen levels, pregnancy, physical trauma or surgery
- Diagnostic method: Biopsy
- Differential diagnosis: Broad, including fibroblastic sarcomas, superficial fibromatosis, nodular fasciitis, gastrointestinal stromal tumor, and scar tissue
- Treatment: Watchful waiting; surgery; radiation therapy‚ chemotherapy; antiestrogen medication; NSAIDs; ablation with cold, heat, or ultrasound
- Incidence: 5–6 per million per year

Aggressive fibromatosis or desmoid tumor is a rare condition. Desmoid tumors are a type of fibromatosis and related to sarcoma, though without the ability to spread throughout the body (metastasize). The tumors arise from cells called fibroblasts, which are found throughout the body. Fibroblasts provide protection to the vital organs and structural support to other tissues, and play a critical role in wound healing. Desmoid tumors tend to occur in women in their thirties but can occur in anyone at any age. They can be either relatively slow-growing or malignant. Aggressive fibromatosis, however, is locally aggressive and invasive, with spindle-like growths. The tumors can lead to pain, life-threatening problems, or, rarely, death when they invade other soft tissue or compress vital organs such as intestines, kidneys, lungs, blood vessels, or nerves. Most cases are sporadic, but some are associated with familial adenomatous polyposis (FAP). Approximately 10% of individuals with Gardner's syndrome, a type of FAP with extracolonic features, have desmoid tumors.

In 2020, the World Health Organization reclassified desmoid tumors (termed desmoid-type fibromatosis) as a specific type of tumor in the category of intermediate (locally aggressive) fibroblastic and myofibroblastic tumors.

Histologically they resemble very low-grade fibrosarcomas, but they are very locally aggressive and tend to recur even after complete resection. The condition is "characterized by a variable and often unpredictable clinical course." There is a tendency for recurrence in the setting of prior surgery; in one study, two-thirds of patients with desmoid tumors had a history of prior abdominal surgery. The condition can be chronic and may be debilitating.

== Causes ==
Wnt signaling pathway alterations are the likely cause of desmoid tumor formation. Mutations have been discovered in both the beta-catenin encoding CTNNB1 gene and the tumor-suppressing APC gene, which affect the Wnt pathway. A 2015 study on desmoid tumors lacking these mutations found that almost all, 95%, "may have mutations that affect the Wnt/β-catenin pathway, suggesting a near universal relationship between desmoid tumors and Wnt signaling."

The majority of cases are sporadic, most of which – 85% – involve a CTNNB1 mutation. Of these, "the three distinct mutations identified are 41A, 45F, and 45. Mutation 45F is associated with a high risk of recurrence." APC mutations affect FAP patients and make up a smaller percentage, 10–15%, of sporadic cases.

The disease has a tendency to occur during and after pregnancy and in exposure to higher estrogen levels, suggesting a hormonal link. One study noted the formation of desmoid tumors in guinea pigs after prolonged estrogen exposure. Other factors include trauma and surgery.

Risk factors for desmoid disease amongst FAP patients include female sex, a 3' APC mutation, a positive family history, and a history of previous abdominal surgery.

== Diagnosis ==
A biopsy is always indicated as the definitive method to determine the nature of the tumor. Diagnosis may be difficult in part due to the use of core needle biopsy over open biopsy.

Similarities among bland spindle-cell lesions lead to a large number of possibilities in diagnosis, including fibroblastic sarcomas, Gardner fibroma, scar tissue or keloids, superficial fibromatosis, nodular fasciitis, myofibroma, collagenous fibroma, gastrointestinal stromal tumor, solitary fibrous tumor, phyllodes tumor, and other conditions. Such conditions may therefore also be incorrectly diagnosed as desmoid tumors (29% of cases in one review). Some 30–40% of desmoid tumors may be misdiagnosed.

=== Classification ===
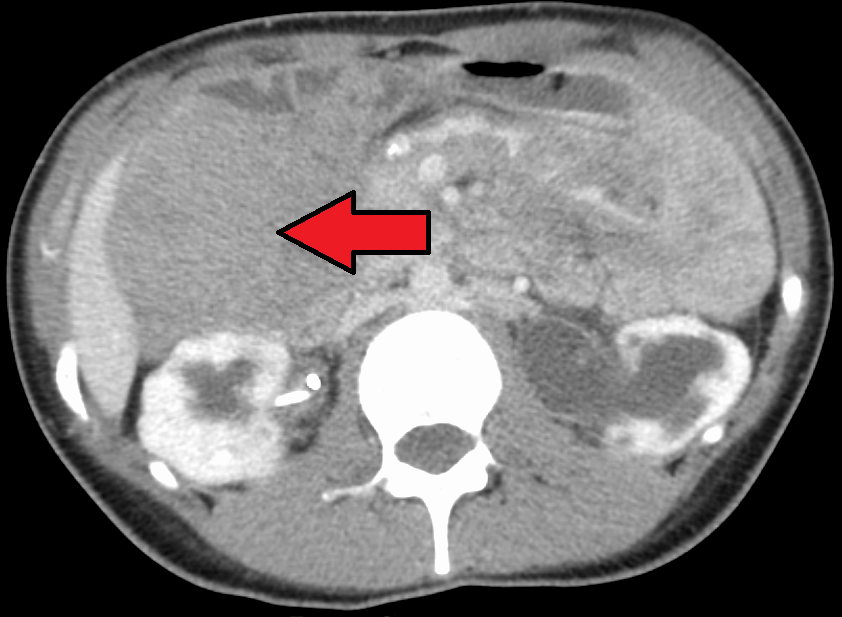
Desmoid tumor

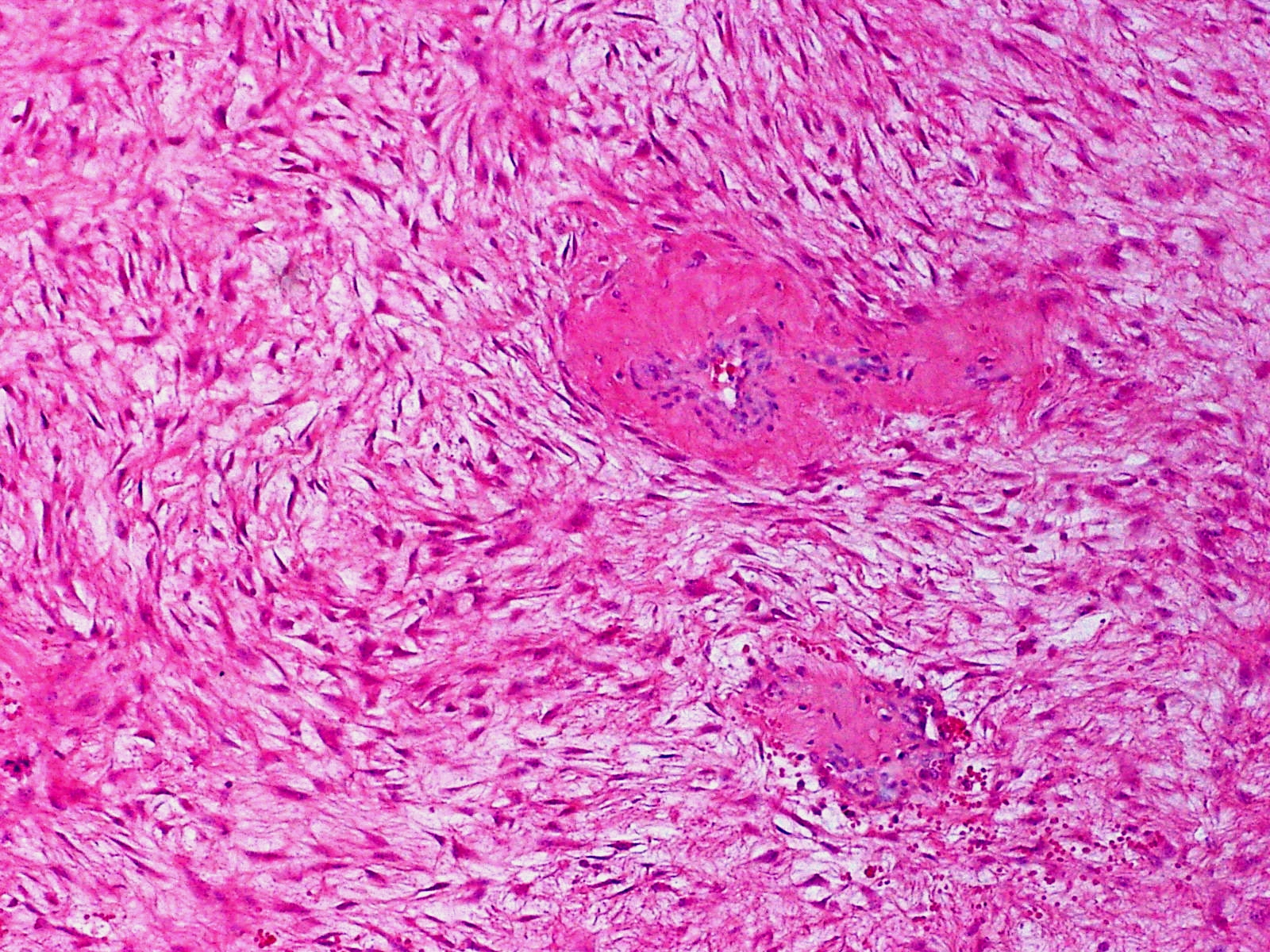
Desmoid fibromatosis, H&E stain. Banal fibroblasts infiltrate the adjacent tissue in fascicles. Mitoses may be infrequent.

Desmoid tumors can occur almost anywhere in the body. They are classified as extra-abdominal, abdominal wall, or intra-abdominal; the last is more common in patients with FAP. Most cases occur in the mesentery, abdominal wall, and extremities. One study has shown extra-abdominal tumors making up 43% of cases, abdominal tumors 49%, and mesenteric 8%, though statistics vary. Pregnancy-related tumors typically arise in the abdominal wall. Tumors located intra-abdominally or in the head and neck have the highest risk of mortality due to the proximity to vital structures.

One analysis has shown a median tumor size of 7.5 cm (3.0 in). Though metastasis cannot occur, the tumors may in some cases be multifocal, with several located in the same body part.

A 3' APC mutation is the most significant risk factor for intra-abdominal desmoid development amongst FAP patients. FAP patients presenting with an abdominal wall desmoid pre-operatively are at an increased risk of developing an intra-abdominal desmoid post-operatively.

Desmoid tumors of the breast are rare, constituting less than 10% of all desmoid tumors, 4% of extra-abdominal desmoid tumors, and 0.2–0.3% of breast tumors. Although benign, they can mimic breast cancer on physical examination, mammography and breast ultrasound and can also be locally invasive. Even though they occur sporadically, they can also be seen as a part of Gardner's syndrome. Some cases – up to 44% – occur in patients who have previously had breast surgery. A high index of suspicion and a thorough triple examination protocol is necessary to detect rare lesions like a desmoid tumor which can masquerade as breast carcinoma. Desmoid tumor of the breast may present a difficulty in the diagnosis especially where imaging studies are not conclusive and suggest a more ominous diagnosis. They may arise in the chest wall or the breast itself.

Desmoid tumors may occur in the head and neck, more commonly among children, and tend to be more aggressive than in other extra-abdominal locations. These tumors constitute up to 23% of extra-abdominal cases. Treatment is typically more aggressive due to the increased dangers of a tumor in the area.

=== Staging ===
There is no standard staging system; desmoid tumors do not fall under cancer staging systems as they do not metastasize.

== Treatment ==
Nirogacestat, a selective gamma secretase inhibitor, was approved for medical use in the United States in November 2023. It is the first medication approved by the US Food and Drug Administration (FDA) for the treatment of desmoid tumors.

Zolucatetide (FOG-001), a beta catenin–T-cell factor (TCF) inhibitor, received FDA orphan drug status in 2026.

In 2026, a New Drug Application was submitted for varegacestat (AL102), another selective gamma secretase inhibitor. The drug was granted FDA orphan drug status in 2023.

Wnt pathway inhibitors are also being developed and studied as of 2024. These include E7386, tegavivint and ipafricept. Additionally, the tumor microenvironment in desmoid tumors is being investigated to find new targets for treatment.

Surgery was the standard treatment for desmoid tumors up to the early 2000s. Due to the condition's unpredictability, more conservative management such as watchful waiting has since become common due to the potential impacts of surgical interventions. As of the 2010s, there is a "clear consensus" from medical groups, including the European Organization for Research and Treatment of Cancer Soft Tissue and Bone Sarcoma Group and the European Society for Medical Oncology: immediate surgical resection is no longer the first-line treatment, particularly in asymptomatic patients. Complete removal is not always possible due to the tumors' infiltrative nature and tendril-like growth.

In more advanced, recurring, or rapidly progressing cases, treatment may consist of complete surgical removal, radiation therapy, antiestrogens (e.g. tamoxifen), nonsteroidal anti-inflammatory drugs (NSAIDs), chemotherapy (e.g. methotrexate and vinblastine or vinorelbine, doxorubicin), or ablation (cold, heat, ultrasound). Treatment with oral tyrosine kinase inhibitor drugs (e.g. imatinib, sorafenib, pazopanib, sunitinib) shows promising success rates. Radiation therapy after surgery may improve outcomes. Despite the condition's hormonal link, anti-hormonal therapies only appear to work in a small subset of patients.

Intestinal transplant is a treatment option for those patients with complicated desmoid tumor, such as those involving the mesenteric root, or those with intestinal failure resulting from the tumor or prior interventions.

MRI or CT imaging scans are commonly used for monitoring.

In contrast with cancer, management of desmoid tumors considers additional outcomes beyond progression-free survival and overall survival, as desmoid tumor patients' "survival is longer and ... age of onset is generally younger compared with cancer patient populations".

== Outcomes ==
=== Disease course ===
The condition is "characterized by a variable and often unpredictable clinical course", often considered chronic, and with the potential to be debilitating. Death, however, is uncommon. Tumors may grow, regress, or remain stable:

- Resolution without treatment (10–28%)
- Progression and resolution (30%)
- Stable (50%)
- Rapid progression (10%)

Management of these lesions is complex, the main problem being the high rates of recurrence particularly in FAP-associated disease. Recurrence rates in general vary from 19 to 77 percent. Conversely, for intra-abdominal fibromatosis without evidence of FAP, although extensive surgery may still be required for local symptoms, the risk of recurrence appears to be lower.

=== Impacts ===
One review summarizes the disease's impact on patients stating, "the burden of [desmoid tumors] is disproportionately borne by women of childbearing and working age, and because it is associated with low mortality and a relatively young patient population, it typically continues for decades."

Symptoms vary significantly as they are dependent on the tumor's location and effects on the surrounding structures. Though desmoid tumors do not metastasize, their invasiveness may lead to pain and loss of function or restricted movement. Chronic pain is an issue for as many as 63% of patients and may be debilitating and lead to reliance on pain medication. Pressure on vital organs or deformity may occur. Rarely, amputation may be necessary due to injury caused by the tumor or its treatments.

Tumors may be misdiagnosed (30–40%) due to their rarity and a lack of knowledge; patients may initially be given inappropriate treatment or poor prognoses due to misdiagnosis with conditions such as malignant sarcoma. Patients may need to visit multiple healthcare providers to receive a diagnosis, causing delay in care. Patients may experience issues including anxiety, fatigue, or trouble sleeping; despite the increased survival rate, their level of emotional distress has been compared to that of cancer patients, including "patients with sarcoma, also a malignant connective tissue disorder". A lack of knowledge by healthcare providers and of information available to patients and others have also been cited as issues.

The economic burden of treatment may be significant, with surgery costs estimated at $50,000 in 2022 US dollars.

Specific instruments to determine health-related quality of life impacts for desmoid patients, the Gounder/Desmoid Tumor Research Foundation (DTRF) Desmoid Symptom/Impact Scale (GODDESS) and the Desmoid-type fibromatosis Quality of Life Questionnaire (DTF-QOL) have been developed and validated.

== Epidemiology ==
The incidence of desmoid tumors is 5–6 per million per year; they constitute 0.03% of tumors and less than 3% of soft-tissue tumors. The primary age range is 15–60, with a peak between 30 and 40 years old; it is 2–3 times more common in females than males. A 2012 retrospective multi-institutional analysis of 211 patients found a median age of 36 and a 68% female prevalence. Children do not have the same sex disparity and are most commonly affected around 15 or 16 years old.

== History and etymology ==
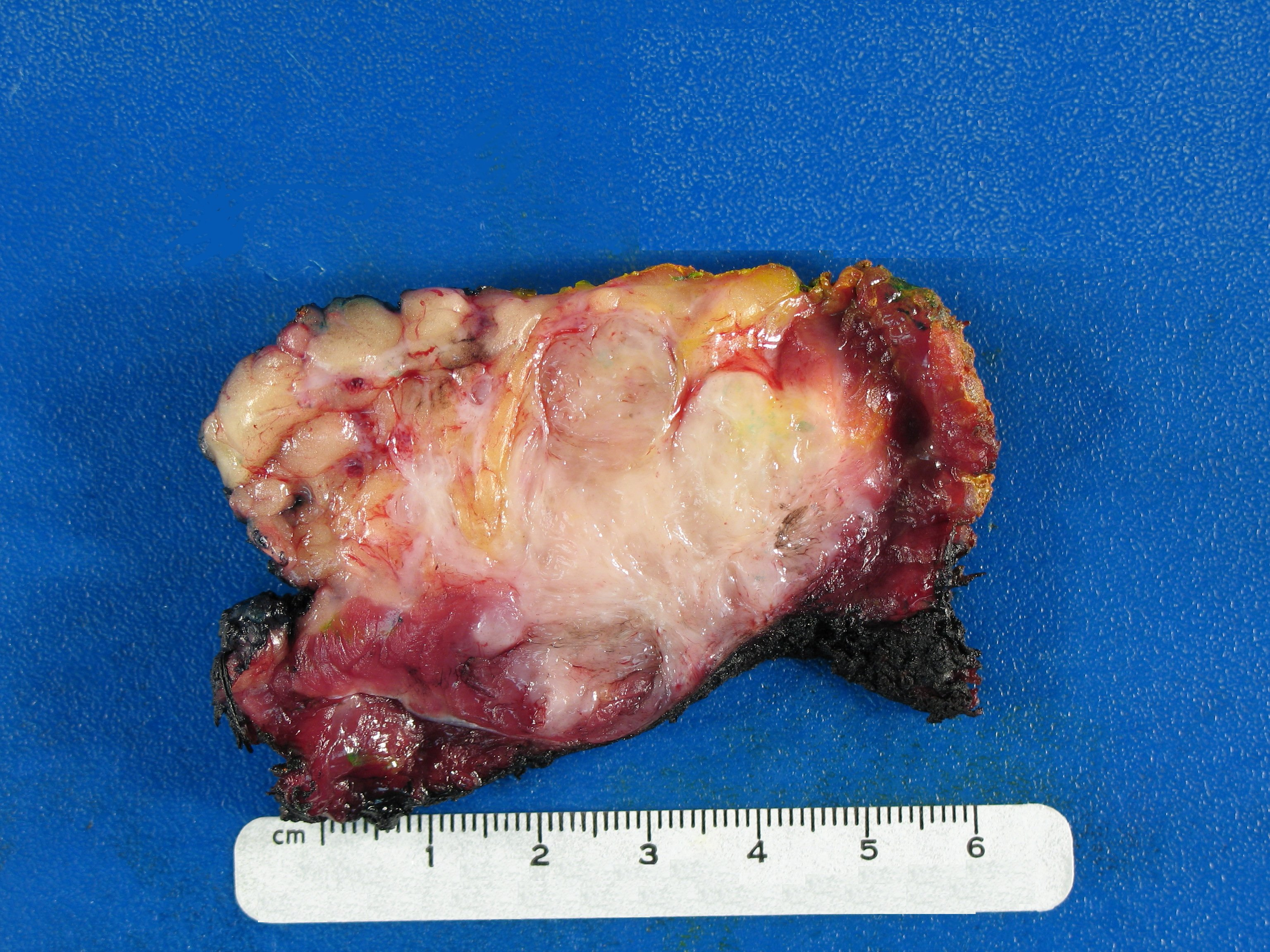
The cut surface of desmoid-type fibromatosis is firm, white, and whorled. The white tumor infiltrates the adjacent skeletal muscle (red tissue – lower left) and fat (yellow tissue – upper left). This tendency for invasion of adjacent normal tissues and structures is the reason that desmoid-type fibromatosis has a relatively high rate of local recurrence, even after surgical removal.

The condition was first described in 1832 by John MacFarlane. Desmoid, used by Johannes Peter Müller in 1838, comes from the Greek desmos 'band or tendon-like', describing the tumors' consistency. The term found broad acceptance in the 1880s. Over the next several decades, Georg Ledderhose and C. Pfeiffer compiled and reported a number of cases, reaching 400 by the early 1900s. In 1923, Ralph W. Nichols first described the correlation between familial adenomatous polyposis (FAP) and desmoid tumors. Arthur Purdy Stout coined the term fibromatosis (in the name congenital generalized fibromatosis, describing myofibromatosis) in 1954.

== ICD-10-CM diagnosis codes ==
Few rare diseases have a specific code in the International Classification of Diseases. As of October 2023, specific codes for desmoid tumors are included in the ICD-10-CM, the United States' diagnosis code system, after a request from the Desmoid Tumor Research Foundation. A subcategory of D48.1, Neoplasm of uncertain behavior of connective and other soft tissue, has been created with more specific codes:

- D48.11: Desmoid tumor
  - D48.110: Desmoid tumor of head and neck
  - D48.111: Desmoid tumor of chest wall
  - D48.112: Desmoid tumor, intrathoracic
  - D48.113: Desmoid tumor of abdominal wall
  - D48.114: Desmoid tumor, intraabdominal
    - Desmoid tumor of pelvic cavity
    - Desmoid tumor, peritoneal, retroperitoneal
  - D48.115: Desmoid tumor of upper extremity and shoulder girdle
  - D48.116: Desmoid tumor of lower extremity and pelvic girdle
    - Desmoid tumor of buttock
  - D48.117: Desmoid tumor of back
  - D48.118: Desmoid tumor of other site
  - D48.119: Desmoid tumor of unspecified site

== Notable patients ==
- Dave Dravecky, American baseball pitcher and motivational speaker
- Kevin Reilly, American football player

== In animals ==
Desmoid tumors occur in dogs, primarily on the head, and more infrequently in horses and cats. A case has also been observed in a goat.
