= Gillespie syndrome =

- Other names: Aniridia-cerebellar ataxia-intellectual disability, Partial aniridia-cerebellar ataxia-oligophrenia
- Gillespie syndrome can be inherited in either an autosomal dominant (left) or autosomal recessive (right) pattern.
- Frequency: 0.0001%

Gillespie syndrome, also called aniridia, cerebellar ataxia and mental deficiency, is a rare genetic disorder. The disorder is characterized by partial aniridia (meaning that part of the iris is missing), ataxia (motor and coordination problems), and, in most cases, intellectual disability. It is heterogeneous, inherited in either an autosomal dominant or autosomal recessive manner. Gillespie syndrome was first described by American ophthalmologist Fredrick Gillespie in 1965.

== Presentation ==
The combination of muscular hypotonia and fixed dilated pupils in infancy is suspicious of Gillespie syndrome. Early onset partial aniridia, cerebellar ataxia, and intellectual disability are hallmark of syndrome. The iris abnormality is specific and seems pathognomonic of Gillespie syndrome. The aniridia consisting of a superior coloboma and inferior iris hypoplasia, foveomacular dysplasia.

Atypical Gillespie syndrome associated with bilateral ptosis, exotropia, correctopia, iris hypoplasia, anterior capsular lens opacities, foveal hypoplasia, retinal vascular tortuosity, and retinal hypopigmentation.

Neurological signs are nystagmus, mild craniofacial asymmetry, axial hypotonia, developmental delay, and mild intellectual disability. Mariën P did not support the prevailing view of a global intellectual disability as a cardinal feature of Gillespie syndrome but primarily reflect cerebellar induced neurobehavioral dysfunctions following disruption of the cerebrocerebellar anatomical circuitry that closely resembles the "cerebellar cognitive and affective syndrome" (CeCAS).

Congenital pulmonary stenosis and helix dysplasia can be associated.

== Genetics ==
Gillespie syndrome is a heterogeneous disorder, and can be inherited in either an autosomal dominant or recessive manner. Autosomal dominant inheritance indicates that the defective gene responsible for a disorder is located on an autosome, and only one copy of the gene is sufficient to cause the disorder, when inherited from a parent who has the disorder.

Autosomal recessive inheritance means the defective gene responsible for the disorder is located on an autosome, but two copies of the defective gene (one inherited from each parent) are required in order to be born with the disorder. The parents of an individual with an autosomal recessive disorder both carry one copy of the defective gene, but usually do not experience any signs or symptoms of the disorder.

PAX6 gene analysis can also be helpful to distinguish between autosomal dominant aniridia and Gillespie syndrome. However atypical Gillespie syndrome is associated mutation with PAX6 gene.

To elucidate the underlying genetic defects karyotyping and the search for de novo translocations especially of chromosome X and 11 should be performed.

This condition is caused by mutations in the inositol 1,4,5-trisphosphate receptor type 1 (ITPR1) gene. This gene is located on the short arm of chromosome 3 (3p26.1). Mutations in this gene have also been associated with spinocerebellar ataxia type 15 and 29.

== Diagnosis ==
Brain MRI shows vermis atrophy or hypoplasic. Cerebral and cerebellar atrophy with white matter changes in some cases.

== History ==
1. 1964 – GILLESPIE FD first described in two siblings with aniridia, cerebellar ataxia, and intellectual disability.
2. 1971 – Sarsfield, J. K. described more cases in a family with normal NCV and muscle biopsy.
3. 1997 – Nelson J reported diffuse MRI abnormality in Cerebral and cerebellar atrophy with white matter changes suggested more diffuse disease.
4. 1998 – Dollfus H reported a patient with a phenotype suggestive of a chromosomal abnormality.
5. 2008 – Mariën P found limited cognitive deficit that closely resembles the "cerebellar cognitive and affective syndrome" (CeCAS).
