= TAZ zinc finger =

zf-TAZ
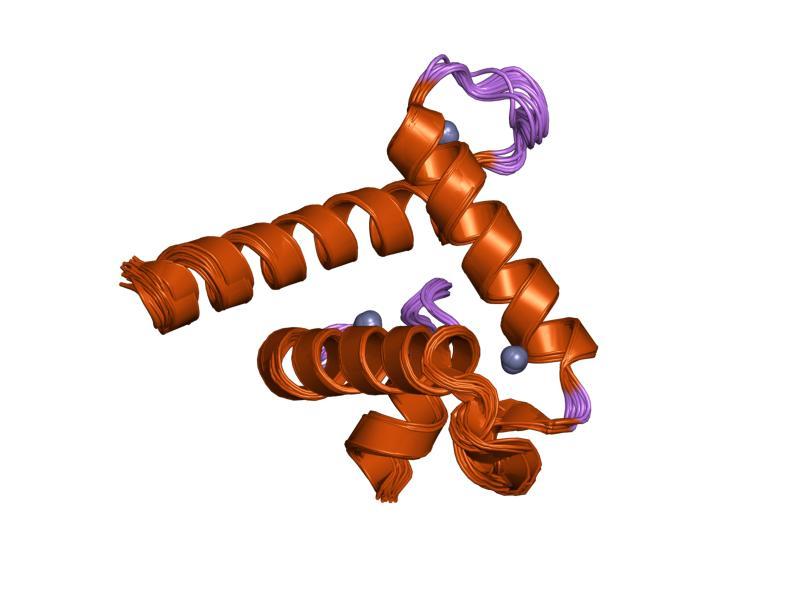
- solution structure of the taz2 domain of the transcriptional adaptor protein cbp

Identifiers
- Symbol: zf-TAZ
- Pfam: PF02135
- InterPro: IPR000197
- SCOP2: 1f81 / SCOPe / SUPFAM
Available protein structures:
- PDB: IPR000197 PF02135 (ECOD; PDBsum)
- AlphaFold: IPR000197; PF02135

In molecular biology, TAZ zinc finger (Transcription Adaptor putative Zinc finger) domains are zinc-containing domains found in the homologous transcriptional co-activators CREB-binding protein (CBP) and the P300. CBP and P300 are histone acetyltransferases (EC) that catalyse the reversible acetylation of all four histones in nucleosomes, acting to regulate transcription via chromatin remodelling. These large nuclear proteins interact with numerous transcription factors and viral oncoproteins, including p53 tumour suppressor protein, E1A oncoprotein, MyoD, and GATA-1, and are involved in cell growth, differentiation and apoptosis. Both CBP and P300 have two copies of the TAZ domain, one in the N-terminal region, the other in the C-terminal region. The TAZ1 domain of CBP and P300 forms a complex with CITED2 (CBP/P300-interacting transactivator with ED-rich tail), inhibiting the activity of the hypoxia inducible factor (HIF-1alpha) and thereby attenuating the cellular response to low tissue oxygen concentration. Adaptation to hypoxia is mediated by transactivation of hypoxia-responsive genes by hypoxia-inducible factor-1 (HIF-1) in complex with the CBP and p300 transcriptional coactivators.

The TAZ domain adopts an all-alpha fold with zinc-binding sites in the loops connecting the helices. The TAZ1 domain in P300 and the TAZ2 (CH3) domain in CBP have each been shown to have four amphipathic helices, organised by three zinc-binding clusters with HCCC-type coordination.
