= Glasdegib =

Treatment for acute myeloid leukemia

Clinical data
- Trade names: Daurismo
- Other names: PF-04449913
- AHFS/Drugs.com: Monograph
- MedlinePlus: a619004
- ATC code: L01XJ03 (WHO)

Legal status
- Legal status: CA: ℞-only; US: ℞-only; EU: Rx-only

Identifiers
- IUPAC name: 1-[(2R,4R)-2-(1H-Benzimidazol-2-yl)-1-methyl-4-piperidinyl]-3-(4-cyanophenyl)urea
- CAS Number: 1095173-27-5
- PubChem CID: 25166913
- DrugBank: DB11978
- ChemSpider: 28518072
- UNII: K673DMO5H9
- KEGG: D10636; as salt: D11107
- ChEBI: CHEBI:145428
- ChEMBL: ChEMBL2043437
- CompTox Dashboard (EPA): DTXSID201025881
- ECHA InfoCard: 100.244.738

Chemical and physical data
- Formula: C_{21}H_{22}N_{6}O
- Molar mass: 374.448 g·mol^{−1}
- 3D model (JSmol): Interactive image
- SMILES: CN1CCC(CC1C2=NC3=CC=CC=C3N2)NC(=O)NC4=CC=C(C=C4)C#N
- InChI: InChI=1S/C21H22N6O/c1-27-11-10-16(24-21(28)23-15-8-6-14(13-22)7-9-15)12-19(27)20-25-17-4-2-3-5-18(17)26-20/h2-9,16,19H,10-12H2,1H3,(H,25,26)(H2,23,24,28)/t16-,19-/m1/s1; Key:SFNSLLSYNZWZQG-VQIMIIECSA-N

Glasdegib, sold under the brand name Daurismo, is a medication for the treatment of newly diagnosed acute myeloid leukemia (AML) in adults older than 75 years or those who have comorbidities that preclude use of intensive induction chemotherapy. It is taken by mouth and is used in combination with low-dose cytarabine.

The recommended dose of glasdegib is 100 mg orally once daily on days 1 to 28 in combination with cytarabine 20 mg subcutaneously twice daily on days 1 to 10 of each 28-day cycle in the absence of unacceptable toxicity or loss of disease control.

The most common adverse reactions are anemia, fatigue, hemorrhage, febrile neutropenia, musculoskeletal pain, nausea, edema, thrombocytopenia, dyspnea, decreased appetite, dysgeusia, mucositis, constipation, and rash.

It is a small molecule inhibitor of sonic hedgehog, which is a protein overexpressed in many types of cancer. It inhibits the sonic hedgehog receptor smoothened (SMO), as do most drugs in its class.

== History ==
Glasdegib was approved for medical use in the United States in December 2018.

FDA approval was based on a multicenter, open-label, randomized study (BRIGHT AML 1003, NCT01546038) that included 115 subjects with newly diagnosed AML who met at least one of the following criteria: a) age 75 years or older, b) severe cardiac disease, c) baseline Eastern Cooperative Oncology Group performance status of 2, or d) baseline serum creatinine >1.3 mg/dL. Subjects were randomized 2:1 to receive glasdegib, 100 mg daily, with LDAC 20 mg subcutaneously twice daily on days 1 to 10 of a 28-day cycle (N=77) or LDAC alone (N=38) in 28-day cycles until disease progression or unacceptable toxicity. The trial was conducted in United States, Canada and Europe.

Efficacy was established based on an improvement in overall survival (date of randomization to death from any cause). With a median follow-up of 20 months, median survival was 8.3 months (95% CI: 4.4, 12.2) for the glasdegib + LDAC arm and 4.3 months (95% CI: 1.9, 5.7) for the LDAC alone arm and HR of 0.46 (95% CI: 0.30, 0.71; p=0.0002).

Glasdegib was granted priority review and orphan drug designation by the U.S. Food and Drug Administration (FDA). It was granted orphan drug designation by the European Medicines Agency (EMA) in October 2017.

Glasdegib was approved for medical use in the European Union in June 2020.
