= Keratopathy =

Keratopathy may refer to:

- Diseases of the human eye:
  - Thygeson's superficial punctate keratopathy
  - Bullous keratopathy
  - Band keratopathy
- Florida keratopathy, a disease of the eye found in dogs, cats, horses and birds
