= Lipofibromatosis =

- Specialty: Pediatrics, pediatric dermatology, pediatric surgery
- Treatment: Surgical resection of the tumor
- Prognosis: Excellent
- Frequency: Very rare

Lipofibromatosis (LPF) is an extremely rare soft tissue tumor which was first clearly described in 2000 by Fetsch et al as a strictly pediatric, locally invasive, and often recurrent (at the site of its surgical removal) tumor. It is nonetheless a non-metastasizing, i.e. benign, tumor. While even the more recent literature has sometimes regarded LPF as a strictly childhood disorder, rare cases of LPF have been diagnosed in adults. The diagnosis of lipofibromatosis should not be automatically discarded because of an individual's age.

Based primarily on histopathologic (i.e. microscopic appearance of specially prepared tissue) analyses, lipofibromatosis was initially regarded as either a type of, or very similar to, aponeurotic fibroma (also termed calcifying aponeurotic fibroma), fibrous hamartoma of infancy, EWSRI-SMAD3-rearranged fibroblastic tumor (also termed EWSR1-SMAD3-positive fibroblastic tumor), or infantile digital fibromatosis. However, further analyses of these tumors' various differences, particularly in the gene abnormalities that their neoplastic cells express, led the World Health Organization in 2020 to classify LPF and each of the four other tumors as distinctly different forms in the category of fibroblastic and myofibroblastic tumors.

Lipofibromatosis-like neural tumor was defined in 2016 as a disorder which initial studies regarded to be a variant of lipofibromatosis. However, more recent studies have emphasized critical differences in the clinical presentations and gene abnormalities between these two tumors. Here, lipofibromatosis-like neural tumor is considered to be a distinct tumor form with its own article.

== Presentation ==
LPF presents as an ill-defined, slow growing tumor mass located in or below the subcutaneous tissue (area of the skin below the dermis) of an extremity or, less commonly, the thigh, trunk, or head areas. Rare single cases of these tumors have been reported in occur in the heart and eye socket. These tumors are often painless but in some cases become painful when manipulated during examination. LPF tumors occur almost exclusively in children at birth (~18% of cases) up to age 8 years with most cases presenting before age 2 years; they are extremely rare in adults. The disorder has a 2:1 male predominance. LPD tumors are usually 5 cm. or smaller and obvious on physical examination. Uncommonly, LPF tumors present after they have invaded adjacent underlying structures such as blood vessels, nerves, and muscles although significant functional impairment of the invaded tissues is uncommon. Individuals have also presented with recurrences of these tumors at the site of surgery in up to 1/3 of all surgically treated cases.

== Pathology ==
LPF is an infiltrative, poorly circumscribed tumor that on microscopic histopathological analysis consists of oval- or spindle-shaped fibroblast-like cells interspersed with muscle cells (as evidenced by the presence of the easily recognizable myofibril portions of muscle cells). These cells give the appearance of infiltrating fat tissues. This fat tissue is composed of adipocyte-like cells, some of which are distinctly abnormal in that they contain one relative large vacuole, resemble lipoblasts (precursors to mature adipocytes), and show considerable variations in their appearances. The distinctly abnormal lipoblasts have been referred to as "pseudolipoblasts". Overall, fat tissue represents >50% of the LPF tumors. As detected by immunohistochemical analyses, LPF tumor tissues also contain scattered foci of cells that express the tumor marker proteins CD99, SMA (i.e. smooth muscle actin), CD34, and less frequently S100 and/or epithelial membrane antigen.

== Gene abnormalities ==
A recent study found various fusion genes in the spindle-shaped cells of LPF tumors using fluorescence in situ hybridization, RNA sequencing, and real-time polymerase chain reaction analyses of formalin-fixed, paraffin-embedded tumor tissue. Fusion genes are abnormal and potentially tumor-inducing genes formed by mergers between parts of two different genes; they are results of chromosomal translocations, interstitial deletions, or inversions. The fusions genes in LPF were: FN1-EGF (i.e. part of the FN1 gene fused to the EGF gene), FN1-TGFA, HBEGF-RBM27, EGR1-GRIA1, EGFR-BRAF, SPARC-PDGFRB, TPR-ROS1, and VCL-RET. Of the twenty cases of lipofibromatosis tumors tested, the FNI-EGF fusion gene occurred in four cases, each of the other fusion genes occurred in just one case, and none of these fusion genes were detected in nine cases. Notably: 1) the EGFR, PDGFRB, and RET genes code for receptor tyrosine kinases, i.e. the epidermal growth factor receptor, platelet-derived growth factor receptor beta, and RET proto-oncogene receptor, respectively, all of which activate the PI3K/AKT/mTOR pathway; 2) the BRAF and ROS1 genes code for serine/threonine-protein kinase B-Raf and proto-oncogene tyrosine-protein kinase, respectively, both of which also activate the PI3K/AKT/mTOR pathway; and 3) products of the EGF gene, i.e. epidermal growth factor, HBEGF gene, i.e. heparin-binding EGF-like growth factor, and TGFA gene, i.e. transforming growth factor alpha are ligands for and activate the epidermal growth factor receptor. Excessive activation of the PI3K/AKT/mTOR pathway is known to promote the development of various tumor types and may be involved in the development of at least some lipofibromatosis tumors.

== Diagnosis ==
The diagnosis of LPF depends on its clinical presentation almost exclusively in newborn and young children and, most importantly, its histopathology as determined on biopsied intact tissue or fine-needle aspiration to obtain a sampling of the tumor's cells. Intact tissue samples typical show abundant mature-appearing adipose (i.e. fat) tissue mixed with a minor component of oval-shaped or spindle-shaped fibroblast-like cells some of which have a pseudolipoblast-like morphology. Needle biopsies should show these cells. However, LPF histopathology can vary widely between cases. The cited gene abnormalities in the above section are insufficient to support a diagnosis of LPF although further study of these and discoveries of other gene abnormalities may do so. The histopathology of lipofibromatosis-like neural tumors (LPF-NT) can closely resemble LPF tumors. Unlike LPF tumors, however, LPF-NT tumors have been diagnosed in adults in more than 27% of cases with the remaining cases diagnosed in children not younger than 14 months/old. Moreover, LPF tumor cells, but not LPF tumor cells, commonly express a fusion gene containing a part of the NTRK1 gene.

== Treatment and prognosis ==
Complete radical surgical resection is the recommended treatment for these rare tumors although modalities such as radiation have been attempted as adjuvant therapy for tumors that can not be totally removed. For diffusely infiltrative LPF tumors, partial resection (i.e. debulking) with the lowest potential postoperative morbidity has been employed. Incomplete surgical removal of the tumor, male sex, presence at birth, occurrence on the hands and feet, and a high mitotic index (i.e. rate of cell proliferation on microscopic tissue examination) are predisposing factors for recurrence. Recurrent tumors, which may occur multiple times, have been successfully treated with repeated complete surgical resections aimed to remove all tumor tissue, incomplete local surgical resections to relieve symptoms, and in rare cases removal of the part of the limb containing the tumor.
