= Lipofibromatosis-like neural tumor =

- Specialty: Pediatric or adult dermatology and surgery
- Usual onset: Children and young adults aged <1 to 38 years
- Causes: An NTRK1- containing fusion gene in ~80% of cases
- Treatment: Surgical resection of the tumor
- Prognosis: Good
- Frequency: Very rare

Lipofibromatosis-like neural tumor (LPF-NT) is an extremely rare soft tissue tumor first described by Agaram et al in 2016. As of mid-2021, at least 39 cases of LPF-NT have been reported in the literature. LPF-NT tumors have several features that resemble lipofibromatosis (LPF) tumors, malignant peripheral nerve sheath tumors, spindle cell sarcomas, low-grade neural tumors, peripheral nerve sheath tumors, and other less clearly defined tumors; Prior to the Agaram et al report, LPF-NTs were likely diagnosed as variants or atypical forms of these tumors. The analyses of Agaram et al and subsequent studies uncovered critical differences between LPF-NT and the other tumor forms which suggest that it is a distinct tumor entity differing not only from lipofibromatosis but also the other tumor forms.

LPF-NTs are locally invasive, are commonly treated by surgical excision, and have a relatively high rate of local recurrence if their surgical excisions are incomplete. They are generally considered to be benign, non-metastasizing (i.e. not spreading to other parts of the body) tumors. However, one case of LFT-NT reported by Agaram et al was associated with metastasis, apparently as a result of the tumor's cells transformation into a malignant sarcoma. Further studies are needed to determine the frequency of such cases and the overall metastatic potential of LPF-NT.

LPF-NTs were given the "neural tumor" terminology because in at least some cases: 1) their tumor cells express S100 and CD34 but not SOX10 proteins, a pattern that is often found in neural and neuroectodermal tumor cells; and 2) their histopathology consists of tumor cell infiltrations into adipose tissues in a pattern that is very similar to that found in some low grade malignant peripheral nerve sheath tumors.

== Presentation ==
Lipofibromatosis-like neural tumors have been reported in the English literature to develop in children and young adults aged from 2 to 38 years (median age ~17 years). However, a recent study in the Chinese literature reported on three cases in infants <1 year old. LPF-NTs have almost always been superficially situated and occurring primarily in the legs and arms with fewer cases in the head, neck, and trunk areas. Three cases of primary and one case of recurrent LPF-NT tumors presented with infiltration into the adjacent skeletal muscles and one recently reported case presented with the tumor situated in, and limited to, the lumbar spine. The tumors have ranged from 1.3 cm to 8.7 cm in maximum diameter; may be tender but usually are painless (although the lumbar spine tumor presented with intermittent abdominal pain); and may be pigmented. In as high as 30% of cases, patients treated with surgical removal of the LPF-NT have presented with recurrent tumors at the site of surgery. The recurrent tumors have, in general, showed similar features to the primary tumors. In particular, they almost always continue to act in a non-malignant manner.

== Pathology ==
Histpathologically, hemotoxin and eosin dye-stained and otherwise properly prepared LPF-NT tissues consist of mildly to moderately atypical spindle-shaped cells that variably infiltrate into subcutaneous adipose (i.e. fat) tissues. The spindle-shaped cells commonly have indistinct nucleoli borders (nucleoli are the largest structures in a cell's nucleus), hyperchromasia (i.e. nuclei that are denser than normal), pale to slightly eosinophilic (i.e. taking up more eosin dye than normal) cytoplasm, and a low rate of cell division as determined by mitotic index analysis. Cases showing tissue necrosis (i.e. foci of dead or dying cells) are rare. The spindle-shaped cells espress S100 and CD34 marker proteins in a variable proportion of cases. One study found that the cells in five of five LDF-NTs overexpress, i.e. contain increased numbers of, one or more of the three Trk receptors (i.e. TrkA, TrkB, and TrkC) as judged using a pan-TRK immunohistochemistry assay. This assay uses a Pan-Trk antibody, i.e. an antibody that binds with and thereby enables the enumeration of all three Trk proteins. Other studies have found that this finding in LPF-NTs is due to overexpression of the TrkA receptor. Tumor tissues that have a histopathology compatible with LPF-NT plus spindle-shaped cells that express D34 and S100 but not SOX10 marker proteins are almost certainly LPF-NTs.

== Gene abnormalities ==
LPF-NT spindle-shaped cells usually express fusion genes which contain a portion of the NTRK1 gene which codes for (i.e. is responsible for producing) the TrkA receptor protein. Fusion genes are abnormal and potentially tumor-inducing genes formed by mergers between parts of two different genes that form as a result of chromosomal translocations, interstitial deletions, or inversions. The NTRK1 gene is located at bands 21 to 22 on the long (i.e "q") arm of chromosome 1. The most often observed NTRK1 fusion gene in LPF-NTs contains a part of NTRK1 fused with a part of the LMNA (i.e. lamin A/C) gene normally located close to the NTRK1 gene at band 22 on the q arm of chromosome 1. Other genes with which NTRK1 has been found to fuse with in LPF-NT are parts of: the TPR (i.e. translocated promoter region, nuclear basket protein) gene located at band 31.1 on the q arm of chromosome 1 and the TPM3 (i.e. tropomyosin 3) gene located at band 21.3 on the q arm of chromosome 1. All three of these fusion genes result from interstitial deletions of the genetic material between a part of the NTRK1 gene and a part of the cited genes on chromosome 1. In studies of LPF-NT tumors on small numbers of individuals, NTRK1-containing fusion genes were detected in 71%, i.e. 10 of 14 individuals, 80%, i.e. 4 of 5 individuals, and 100%, i.e. 5 of 5 individuals with LPF-NT. Individuals diagnosed with non-neural lipofibromatosis have not been reported to harbor NTRK1-containing fusion genes.

The protein products (termed fusion proteins or chimeric proteins) of the three NTRK1-containing fusion genes possess overactive and unregulated TrkA, i.e. tropomyosin receptor kinase A, activity that stimulates the PI3K/AKT/mTOR, MAPK/ERK, and PLCG1 cell signaling pathways. Each of these pathways are known to promote the development and/or progression of a large variety of benign and malignant tumors. Studies have suggested that one or more of these pathways may drive LPF-NT.

== Diagnosis ==
The diagnosis of LPF-NT rests upon a combination of factors none of which by themselves are definitive. These factors are its clinical presentation, histopathology including the presence of tumor cells expressing S100 and CD34 but not SOX10 marker proteins, and tumor cell expression of a fusion gene containing part of the NTRK1 gene. LPF-NT has been difficult to distinguish from other oval-shaped/spindle-shaped fibroplast tumors that arise in the superficial soft tissue of young individuals such as lipofibromatosis (the presence of a NTRK1 fusion gene indicates the tumor is an LPF-NT) and fibroma, infantile fibromatosis, congenital fibrosarcoma, solitary fibrous tumor, and dermatofibrosarcoma protuberans (broad expression of the CD34 and/or S100 marker protein strongly supports the diagnosis of LPF-NT).

== Treatment ==
LPF-NTs are commonly treated by surgical resection. In up to 30% of these resections, the tumor recurs at the surgical site apparently because the resections did not remove all of the tumor. Recurrences of the tumor have been successfully treated by repeated resections. However, there one reported case and it is expected that there will be future case of LPF-NT that because of their tumors' location, size, or aggressiveness, require alternatives or adjuvants to surgical resection. The authors of many studies have suggested that one promising alternative and/or adjuvant to surgical treatment of LPF-NTs is to inhibit the action of the NTRK1 gene's product, TrkA.

As indicated in the above section on gene abnormalities, about 80% (19 of 24 cases) of LPF-NTs contain NTRK1-containing fusion genes that produce abnormally high levels of overactive and uncontrolled tropomyosin receptor kinase A activity which may promote the development and/or progression of LPF-NTs. Two inhibitors of receptor tyrosine kinase activity, larotrectinib and entrectinib, have been shown to be effective in phase I (screening for safety) and phase II (assessing dosage requirements and efficacy) clinical trials in patients with various types of Trk fusion gene-positive tumors although not in LPF-NTs. In 2018, the Food and Drug Administration approved larotrectinib for adult and pediatric patients with solid tumors that: 1) have an NTRK-containing fusion gene that is not resistant to the drug; 2) are metastatic or surgically inaccessible; 3) have no satisfactory alternative treatment; or 4) have progressed after treatment. In 2020, a young adult presented with a spinal LPF-NT that, because of its size and location, was deemed surgically unresectable. The patient was treated in a clinical trial with entrectinib. The treatment reduced the tumor's size by 45% within 20 weeks at which time it was removed surgically and found to consist of 95% necrotic cells. While further clinical trials on many more individuals are needed, Tka-inhibitors may have a role as adjuvants to surgery or in various severe cases as the main treatment of LPF-NTs.
