= Radical surgery =

- Other names: Radical dissection
- Specialty: Surgery
- [edit on Wikidata]

Radical surgery, also called radical dissection, is surgery that is more extensive than "conservative" surgery.

In surgical oncology, radical surgery is surgery intended to remove both a tumor and any metastases of it, for purposes of diagnosis or treatment. It typically includes the removal of a tumor or mass and ancillary lymph nodes that may drain the mass, as in radical mastectomy. It is opposed to for example palliative surgery which is intended for symptom relief rather than complete removal of cancer tissue.

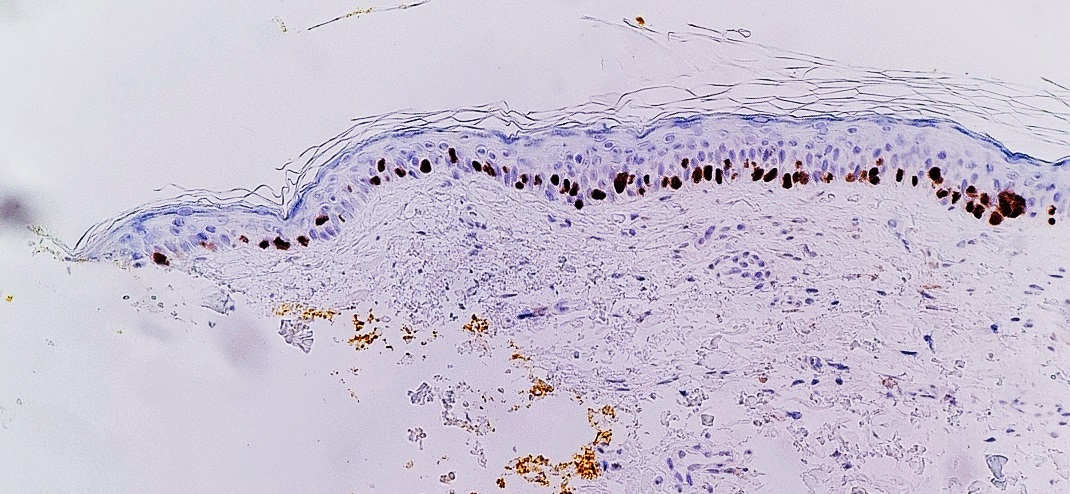
Immunohistochemistry with SOX10 (staining the cell nuclei of melanocytes) of lentigo maligna, showing malignant melanocytes all the way to the resection margin (inked in yellow, at left), conferring a diagnosis of a not radically removed lesion.

In histopathology, radicality of tumor excisions is generally defined as the absence of tumor cells in a certain resection margin, with the specific margin width varying by tumor type and local guidelines. A non-radical excision may require re-excision.
