= Journal of Surgical Oncology =

- Discipline: Oncology, surgery
- Language: English
- Edited by: Stephen F. Sener

Publication details
- History: 1969-present
- Publisher: Wiley-Liss
- Frequency: Monthly
- Impact factor: 3.454 (2020)

Standard abbreviations
- ISO 4: J. Surg. Oncol.

Indexing
- CODEN: JSONAU
- ISSN: 0022-4790 (print); 1096-9098 (web)
- OCLC no.: 783824170

Links
- Journal homepage; Online access; Online archive

The Journal of Surgical Oncology is a monthly peer-reviewed medical journal covering surgical oncology. It was established in 1969 and is published by Wiley-Liss. The editor-in-chief is David J. Bentrem (Northwestern University). According to the Journal Citation Reports, the journal has a 2020 impact factor of 3.454, ranking it 157th out of 243 journals in the category "Oncology" and 60th out of 212 journals in the category "Surgery".
