= Bread loafing =

Pictogram of margin controlled histology or CCPDMA

Pictogram of standard bread loafing histology

False negative in standard bread loafing histology

Bread loafing is a common method of processing surgical specimens for histopathology. The process involves cutting the specimen into 3 or more sections. The cut sections are mounted by embedding in paraffin or frozen medium. The cut edge is then thinly sliced with a microtome or a cryostat. The thin slices are then mounted on a glass slide, stained, and covered with another layer of glass.

This method is used to determine the negative resection margin for skin tumors, and is also known as POMA (Post Operative Margin Assessment as referred to by the National Comprehensive Cancer Network). It has a higher false negative error rate than the CCPDMA method of tissue processing. The error rate is reduced when the surgical margin is increased, and the error rate is increased when the surgical margin is decreased. For this reason, it is not used near the eyelids, and in other cosmetically important areas of the body.

Bread loafing false negative error rate can be reduced by "cutting through the block". Basically, the entire surgical specimen is sliced, and mounted. Even though this method will approach CCPDMA, frequently, about 9 out of 10 sections are discarded. Thus, only 10% of the surgical margin is examined. If the whole "ribbon" was mounted, it would take an inordinate number of glass slides, and not be feasible.
