= Histopathology =

Microscopic examination of tissue to study and diagnose disease

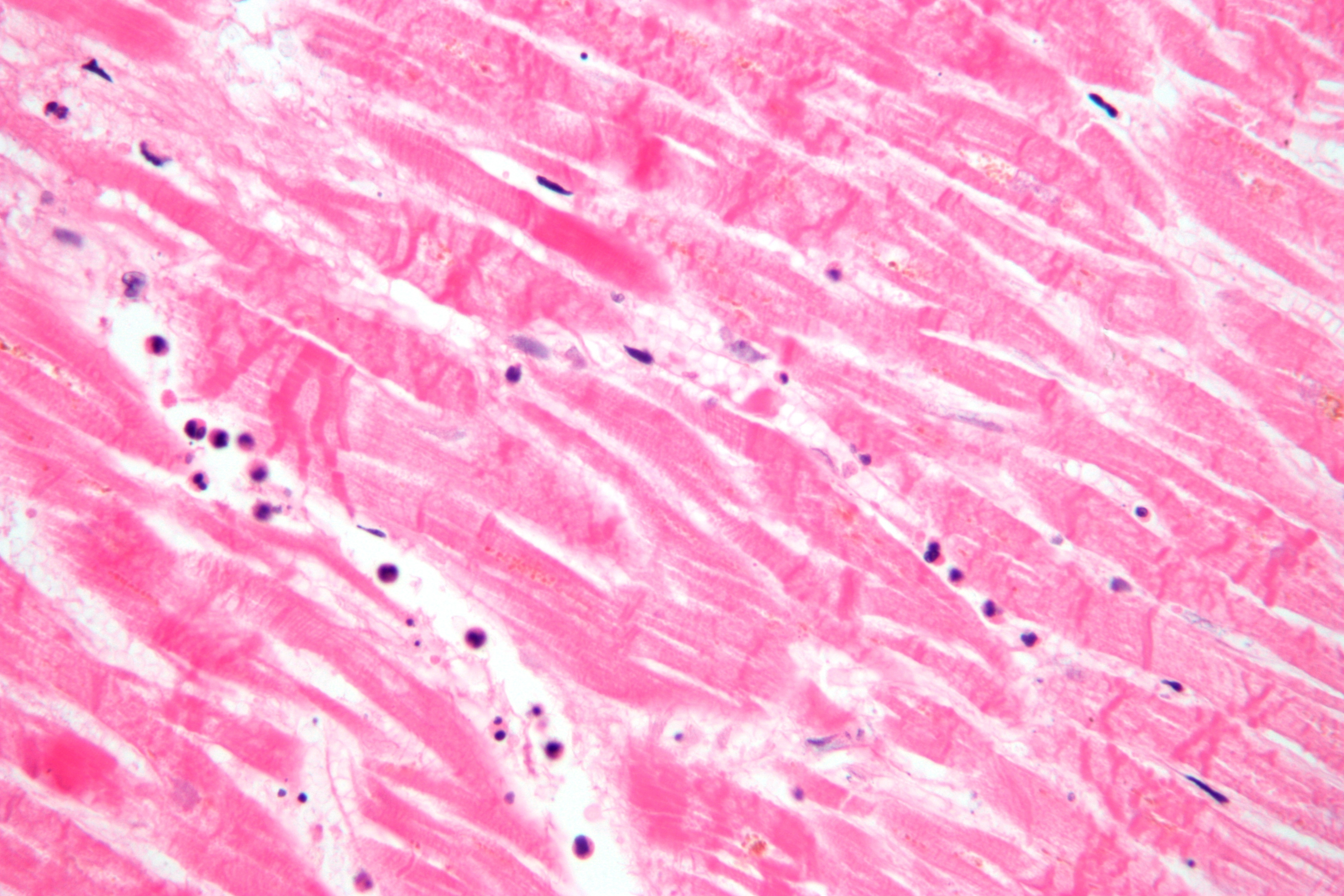
Microscope image showing contraction band necrosis, a histopathologic finding of myocardial infarction (heart attack).

Histopathology (compound of three Greek words: ἱστός histos 'tissue', πάθος pathos 'suffering', and -λογία -logia 'study of') is the microscopic examination of tissue in order to study the manifestations of disease. Specifically, in clinical medicine, histopathology refers to the examination of a biopsy or surgical specimen by a pathologist, after the specimen has been processed and histological sections have been placed onto glass slides. In contrast, cytopathology examines free cells or tissue micro-fragments (as "cell blocks").

== Collection of tissues ==
Histopathological examination of tissues starts with surgery, biopsy, or autopsy. The tissue is removed from the body or plant, and then, often following expert dissection in the fresh state, placed in a fixative which stabilizes the tissues to prevent decay. The most common fixative is 10% neutral buffered formalin (corresponding to 3.7% w/v formaldehyde in neutral buffered water, such as phosphate buffered saline).

== Preparation for histology ==
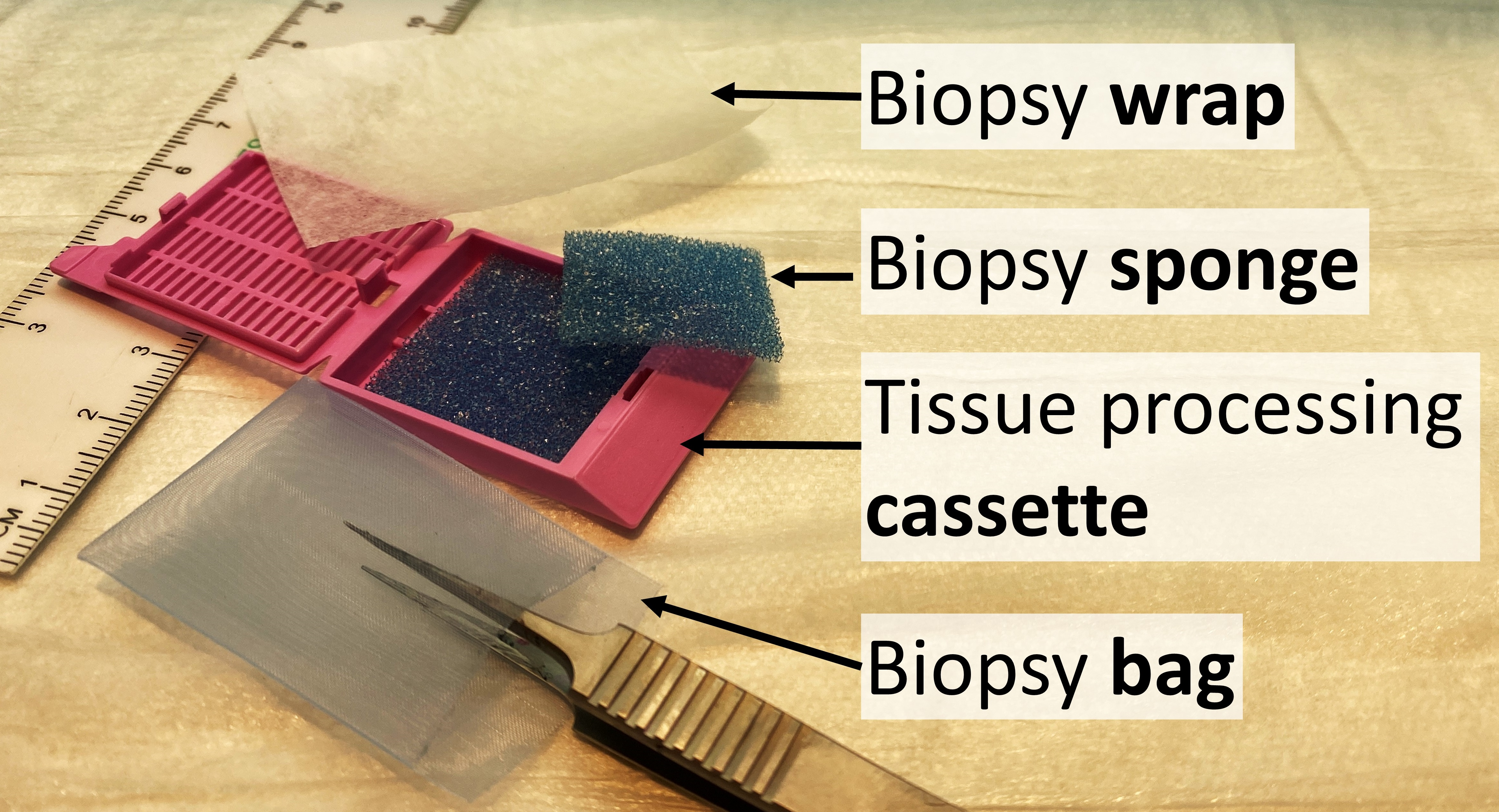
Items used for submitting specimens: (Biopsy) wrap, (biopsy) sponge, (tissue processing) cassette and (biopsy) bag.

The tissue is then prepared for viewing under a microscope using either chemical fixation or frozen section.

If a large sample is provided e.g. from a surgical procedure then a pathologist looks at the tissue sample and selects the part most likely to yield a useful and accurate diagnosis - this part is removed for examination in a process commonly known as grossing or cut up. Larger samples are cut to correctly situate their anatomical structures in the cassette. Certain specimens (especially biopsies) can undergo agar pre-embedding to assure correct tissue orientation in cassette & then in the block & then on the diagnostic microscopy slide. This is then placed into a plastic cassette for most of the rest of the process.

=== Chemical fixation ===
In addition to formalin, other chemical fixatives have been used. But, with the advent of immunohistochemistry (IHC) staining and diagnostic molecular pathology testing on these specimen samples, formalin has become the standard chemical fixative in human diagnostic histopathology. Fixation times for very small specimens are shorter, and standards exist in human diagnostic histopathology.

=== Processing ===
Water is removed from the sample in successive stages by the use of increasing concentrations of alcohol. Xylene is used in the last dehydration phase instead of alcohol - this is because the wax used in the next stage is soluble in xylene where it is not in alcohol allowing wax to permeate (infiltrate) the specimen. This process is generally automated and done overnight. The wax infiltrated specimen is then transferred to an individual specimen embedding (usually metal) container. Finally, molten wax is introduced around the specimen in the container and cooled to solidification so as to embed it in the wax block. This process is needed to provide a properly oriented sample sturdy enough for obtaining a thin microtome section(s) for the slide.

Once the wax embedded block is finished, sections will be cut from it and usually placed to float on a water bath surface which spreads the section out. This is usually done by hand and is a skilled job (histotechnologist) with the lab personnel making choices about which parts of the specimen microtome wax ribbon to place on slides. A number of slides will usually be prepared from different levels throughout the block. After this the thin section mounted slide is stained and a protective cover slip is mounted on it. For common stains, an automatic process is normally used; but rarely used stains are often done by hand.

=== Frozen section processing ===
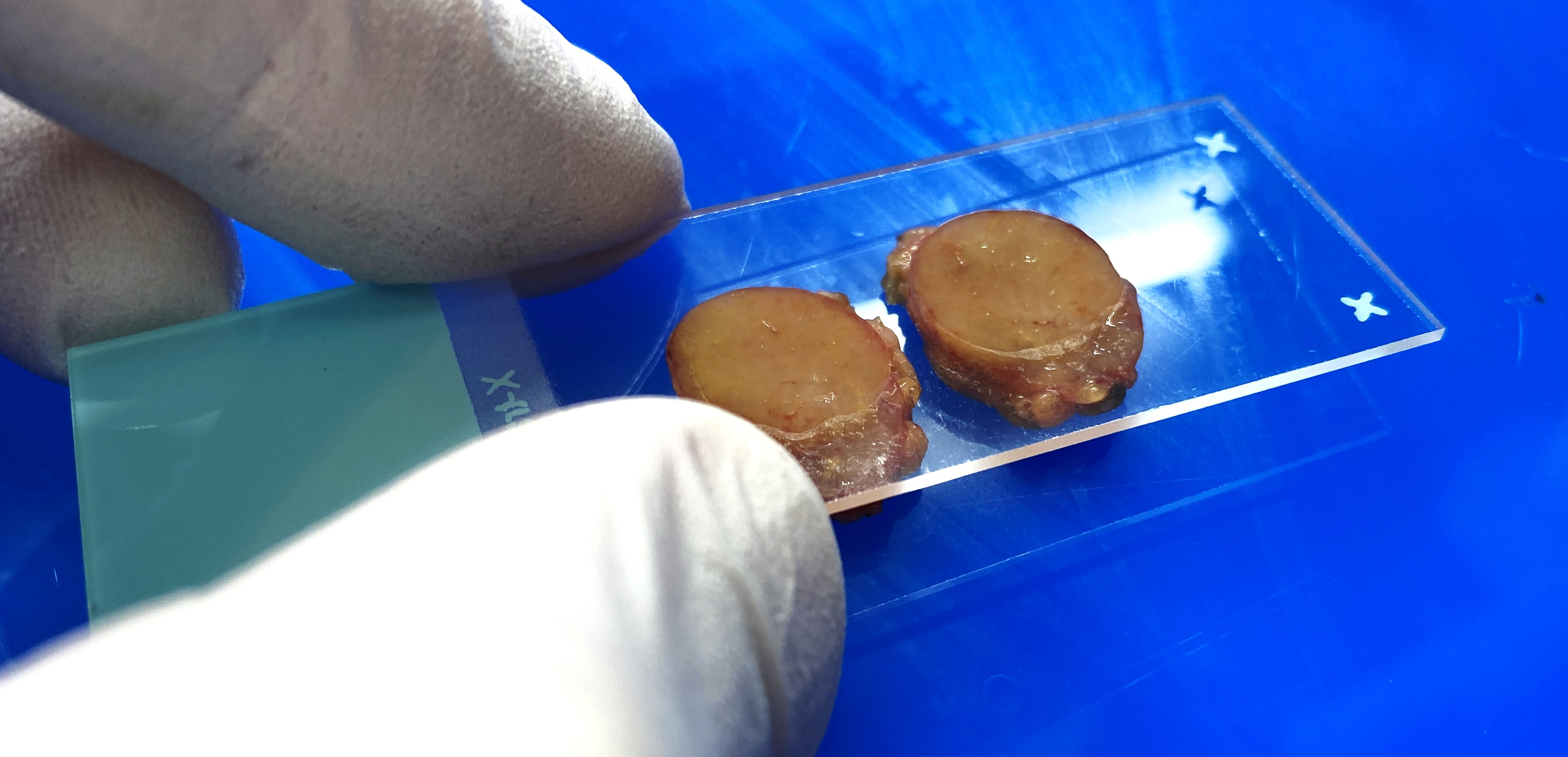
There is also the option to make a "touch prep", wherein a glass slide is simply pressed against the tissue and then exposed to a fixative solution. The glass slide can then be stained and examined. This is feasible for an initial evaluation of suspected lymphomas.

An initial evaluation of a suspected lymphoma is to make a "touch prep" wherein a glass slide is lightly pressed against excised lymphoid tissue, and subsequently stained (usually H&E stain) for evaluation under light microscopy. The second method of histology processing is called frozen section processing. This is a highly technical scientific method performed by a trained histoscientist. In this method, the tissue is frozen and sliced thinly using a microtome mounted in a below-freezing refrigeration device called the cryostat. The thin frozen sections are mounted on a glass slide, fixed immediately & briefly in liquid fixative, and stained using the similar staining techniques as traditional wax embedded sections. The advantages of this method are rapid processing time, less equipment requirement, and less need for ventilation in the laboratory. The disadvantage is the poor quality of the final slide. It is used in intra-operative pathology for determinations that might help in choosing the next step in surgery during that surgical session (for example, to preliminarily determine clearness of the resection margin of a tumor during surgery).

== Staining of processed histology slides ==
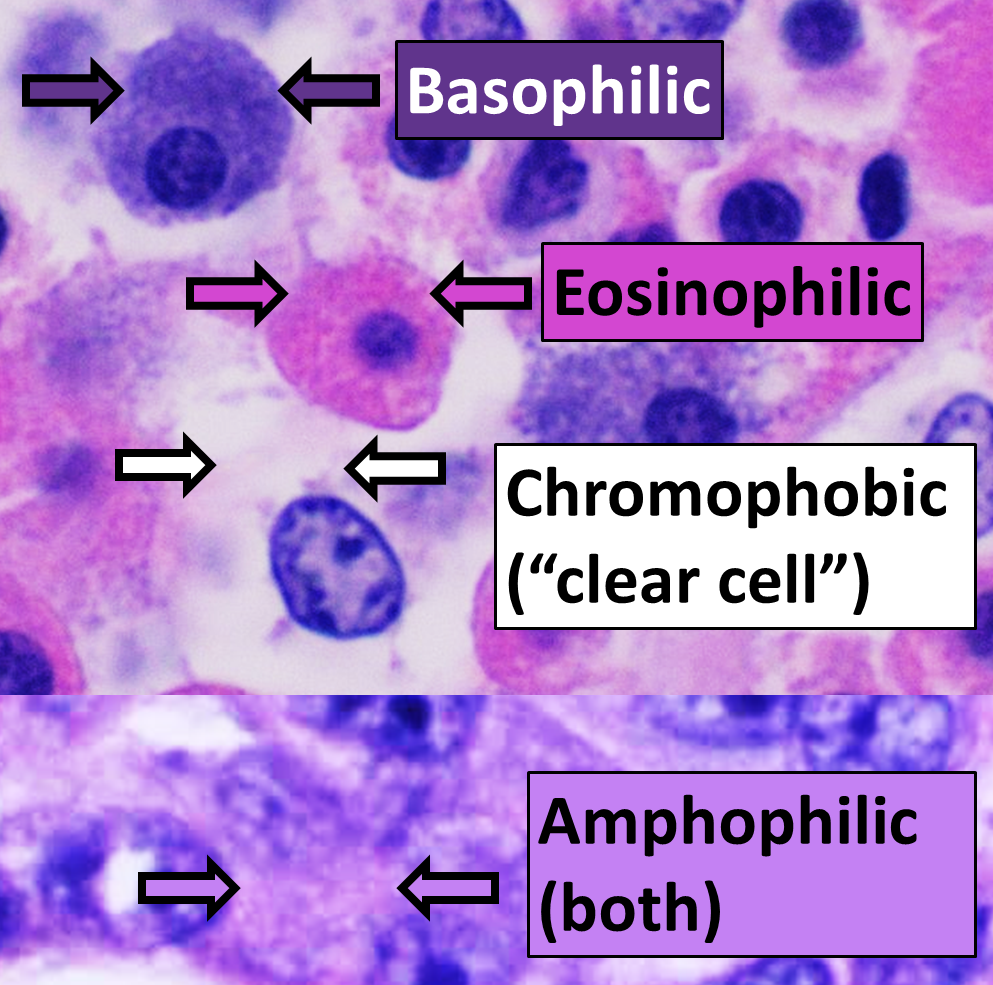
Main types of staining seen on H&E stain.

This can be done to slides processed by the chemical fixation or frozen section slides. To see the tissue under a microscope, the sections are stained with one or more pigments. The aim of staining is to reveal cellular components; counterstains are used to provide contrast.

The most commonly used stain in histology is a combination of hematoxylin and eosin (often abbreviated H&E). Hematoxylin is used to stain nuclei blue, while eosin stains the cytoplasm and the extracellular connective tissue matrix of most cells pink. There are hundreds of various other techniques which have been used to selectively stain cells. Other compounds used to color tissue sections include safranin, Oil Red O, congo red, silver salts and artificial dyes. Histochemistry refers to the science of using chemical reactions between laboratory chemicals and components within tissue. A commonly performed histochemical technique is the Perls' Prussian blue reaction, used to demonstrate iron deposits in diseases like Hemochromatosis.

Recently, antibodies have been used to stain particular proteins, lipids and carbohydrates. Called immunohistochemistry, this technique has greatly increased the ability to specifically identify categories of cells under a microscope. Other advanced techniques include in situ hybridization to identify specific DNA or RNA molecules. These antibody staining methods often require the use of frozen section histology. These procedures above are also carried out in the laboratory under scrutiny and precision by a trained specialist medical laboratory scientist (a histoscientist). Digital cameras are increasingly used to capture histopathological images.

== Interpretation ==
The histological slides are examined under a microscope by a pathologist, a medically qualified specialist who has completed a recognised training program. This medical diagnosis is formulated as a pathology report describing the histological findings and the opinion of the pathologist. In the case of cancer, this represents the tissue diagnosis required for most treatment protocols. In the removal of cancer, the pathologist will indicate whether the surgical margin is cleared, or is involved (residual cancer is left behind). This is done using either the bread loafing or CCPDMA method of processing. Microscopic visual artifacts can potentially cause misdiagnosis of samples. Scanning of slides allows for various methods of digital pathology, including the application of artificial intelligence for interpretation.

Following are examples of general features of suspicious findings that can be appreciated from low to high magnification on histopathology:

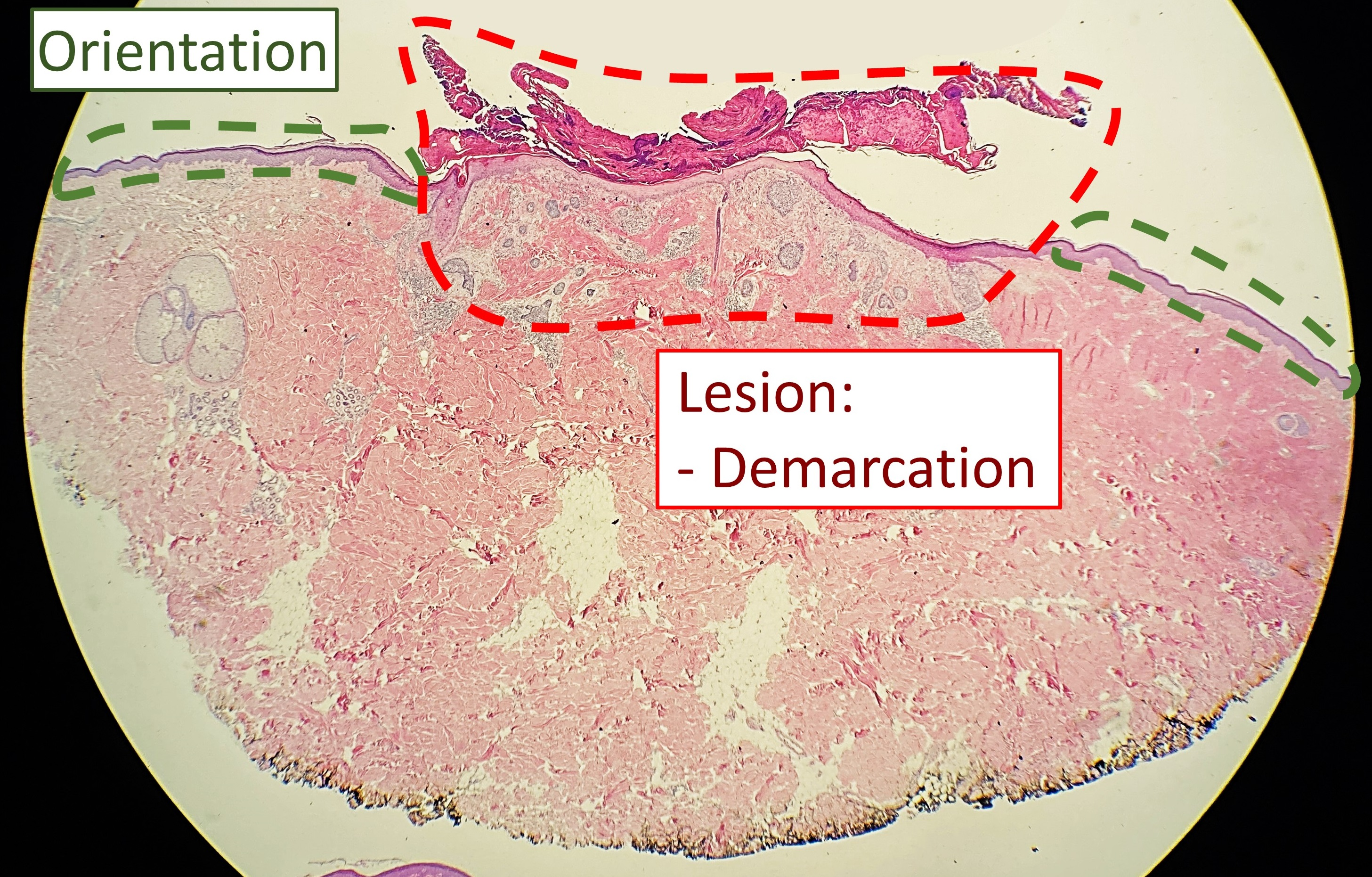
Orientation (lowest magnification): In this case oriented by the skin surface (green). A lesion is seen (red) and its demarcation can be discerned (diffuse in this case)

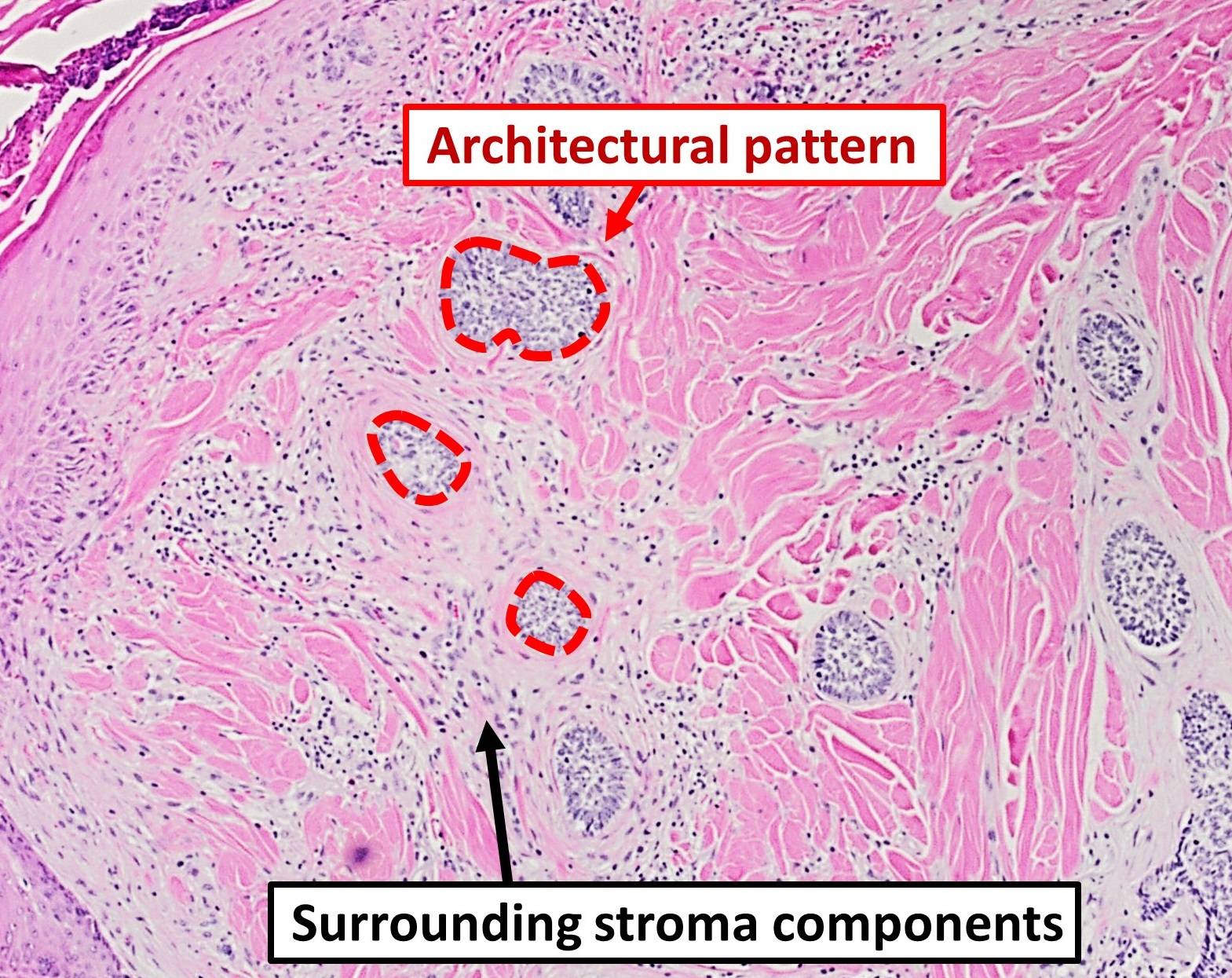
Architectural pattern of any suspicious cells, in this case nests of cells, as well as components of the intervening stroma.

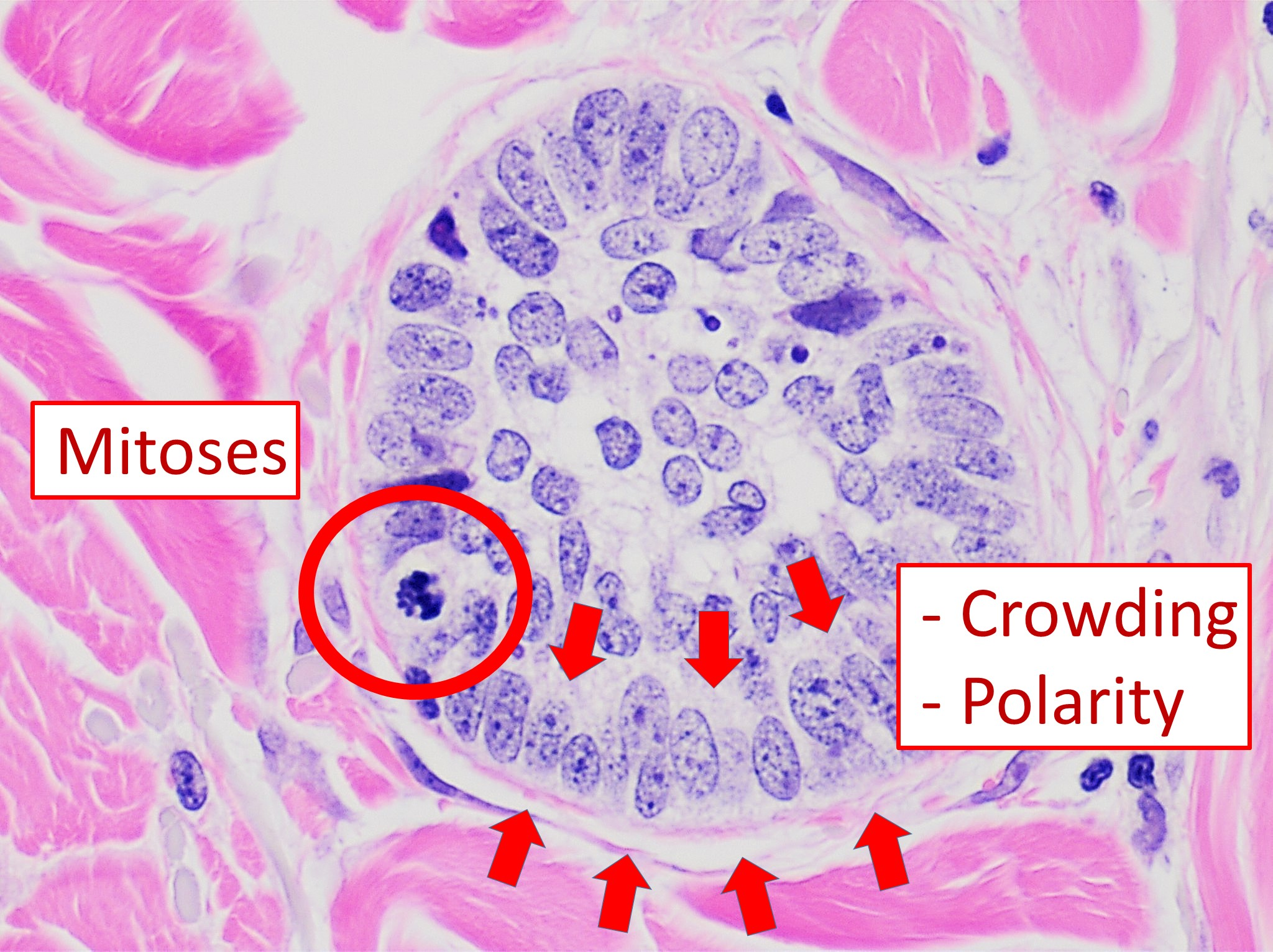
Cellular arrangement, including crowding and cell polarity (common tendencies among cells at the border, such as elongation or "palisading" in this case). Amount of mitoses can also be appreciated at this level.

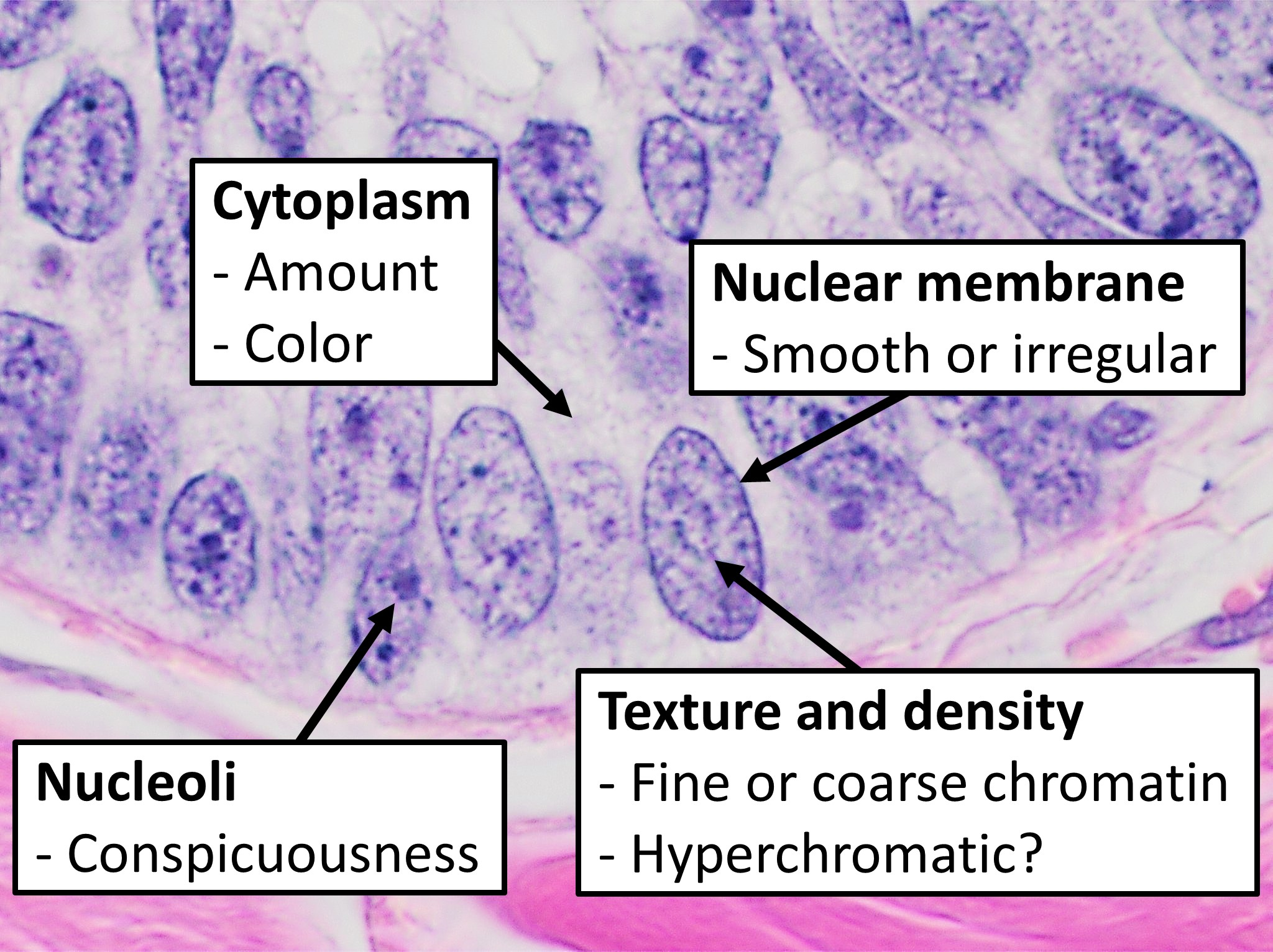
Subcellular features (may need highest magnification)

=== Architectural patterns ===
Major histopathologic architectural patterns include:

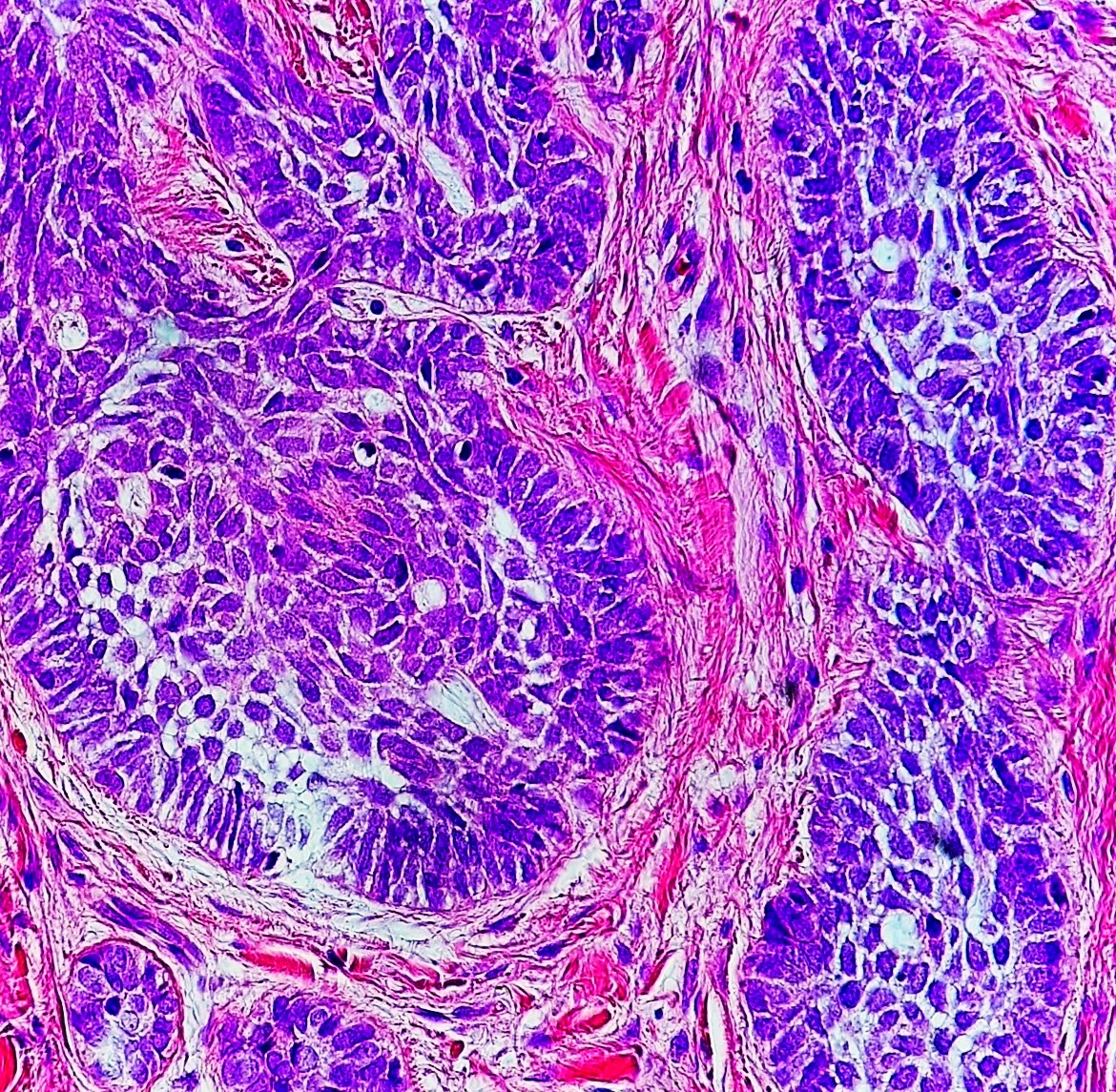
Nests: islands of cells of similar type.

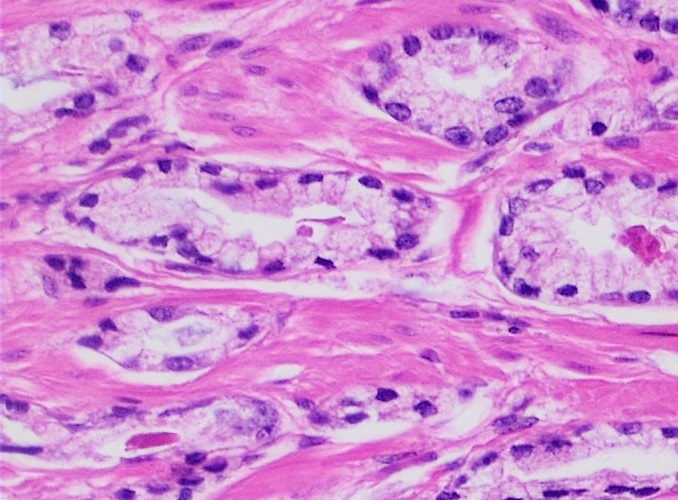
Acinar or tubular: Each acinus consists of cells that surround a lumen.

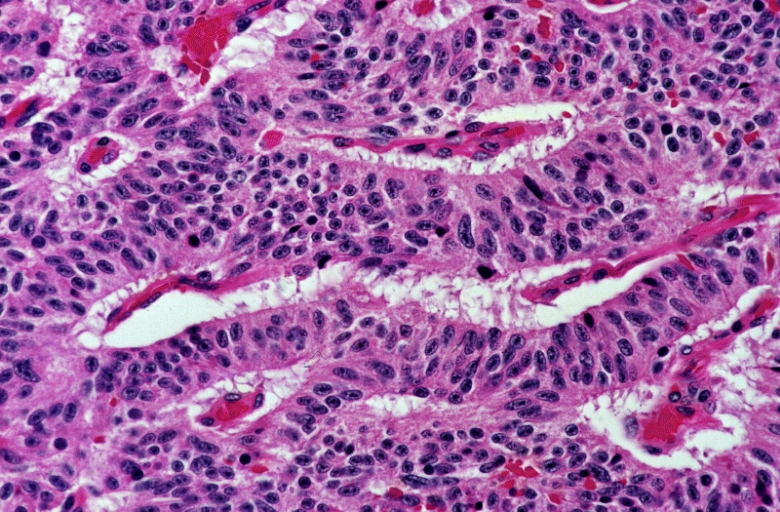
Trabecular, elongated (rod-shaped) groups of cells.

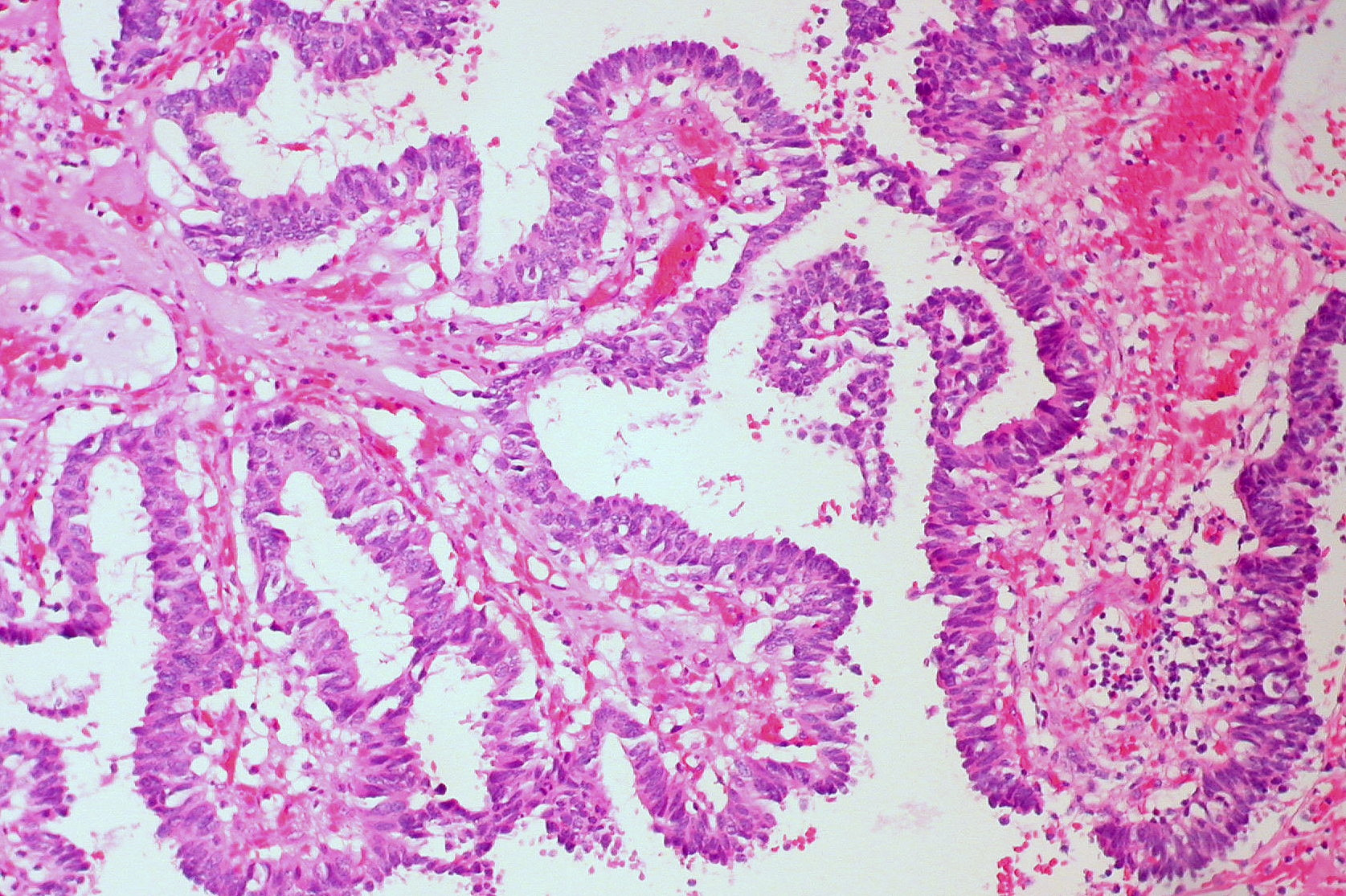
Papillary: Protuberances of epithelioid cells around fibrovascular cores.

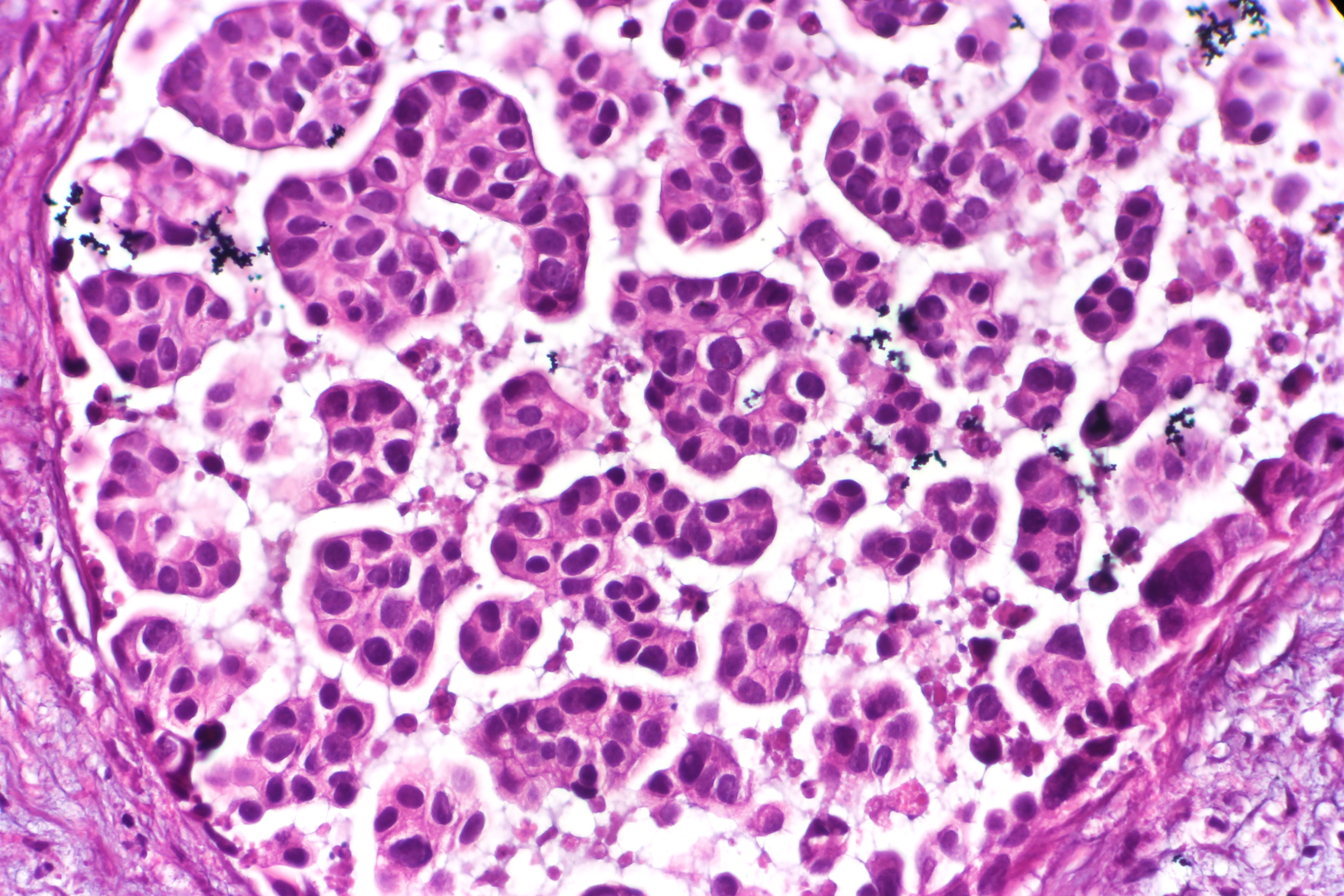
Micropapillary: Papillary tufts without fibrovascular cores

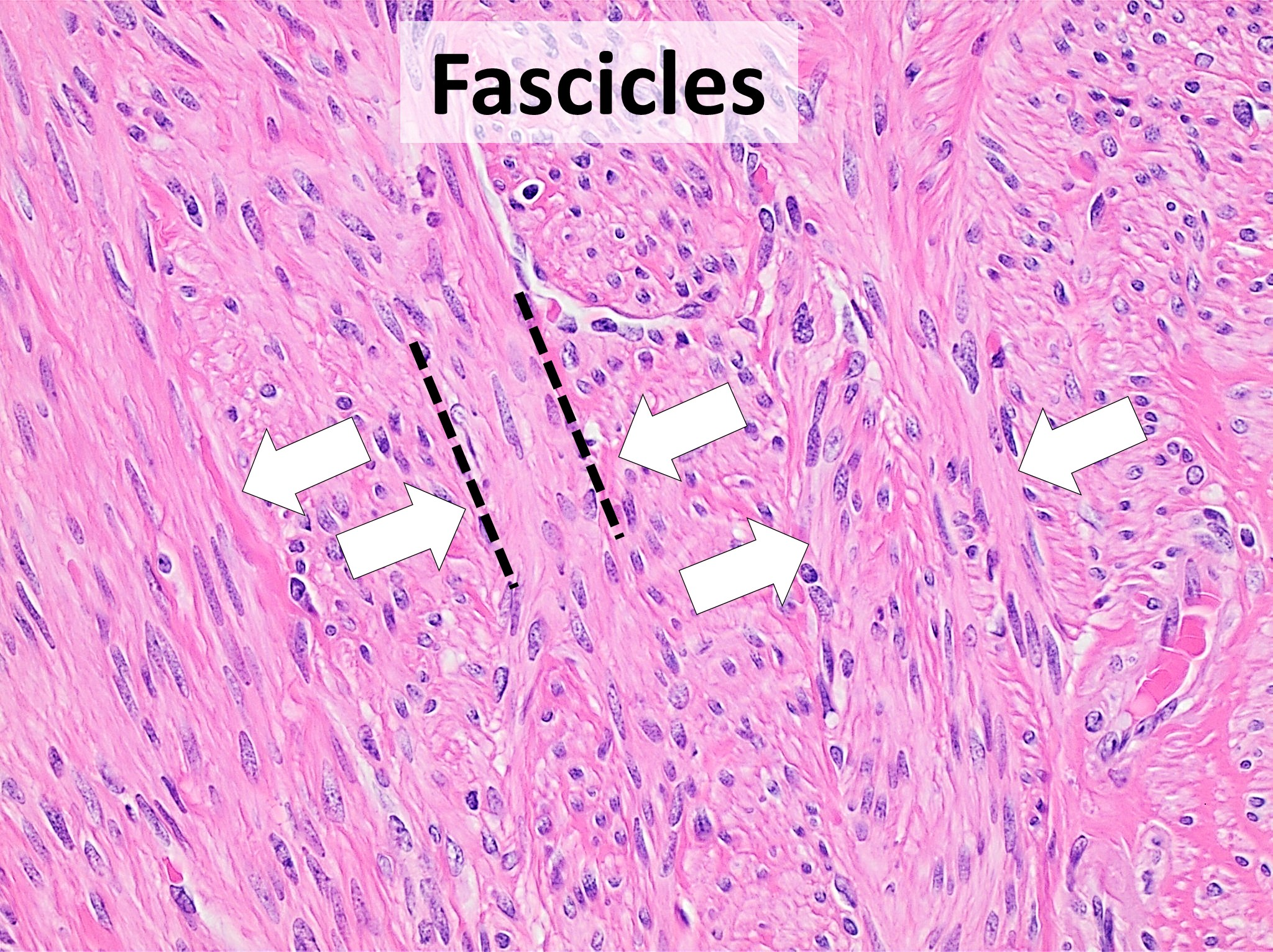
Fascicular: Generally the same cell type throughout, but some form band-like groups that are aligned in the same direction.

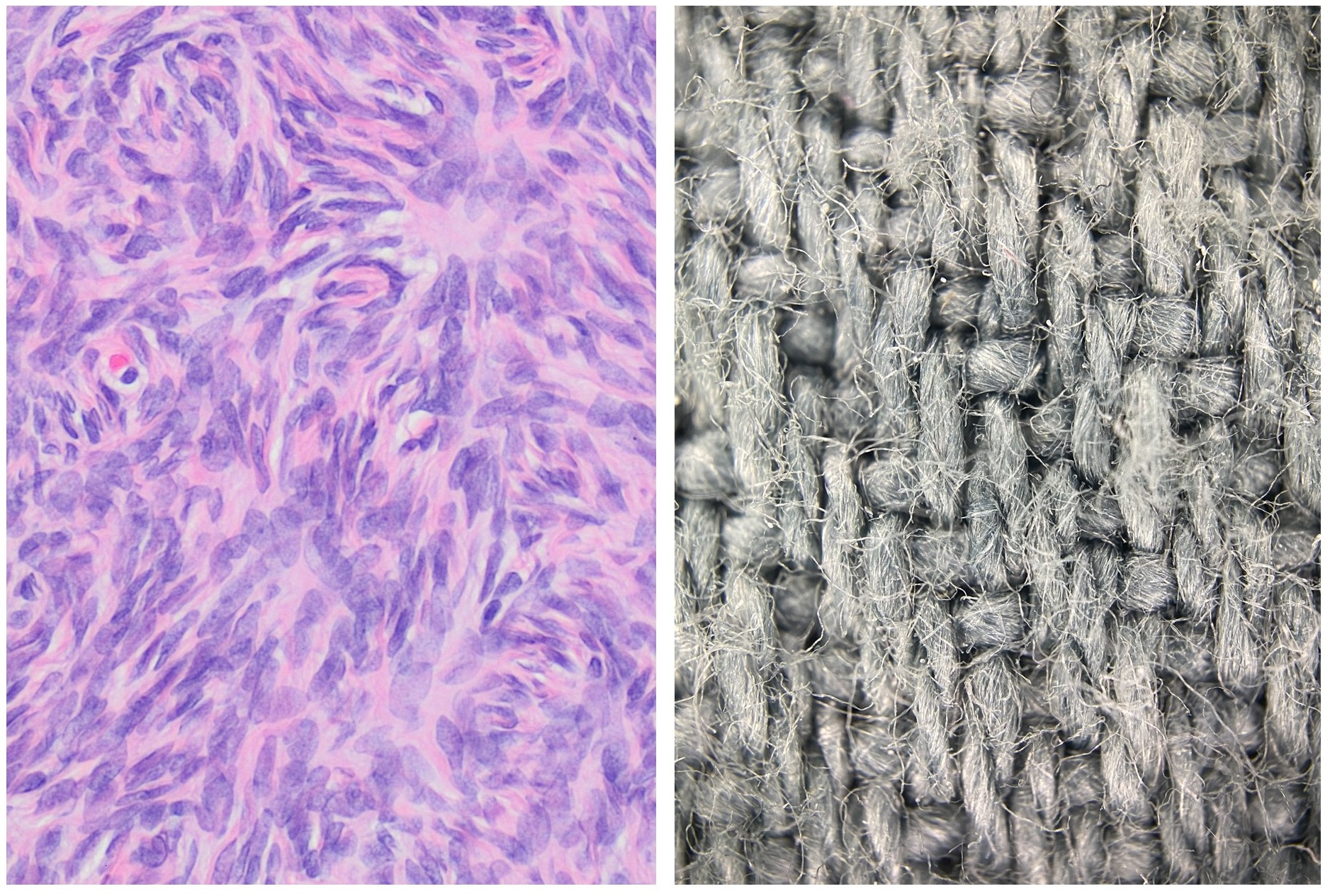
Woven or storiform: Elongated cells or nuclei wherein small bundles are aligned in an otherwise haphazard pattern.

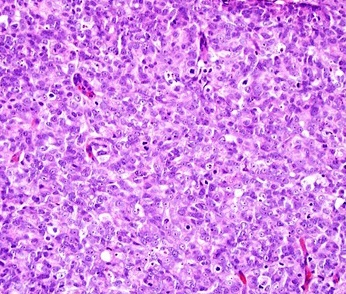
Solid: More or less the same cell type throughout, with no spaces between, and no other particular pattern.

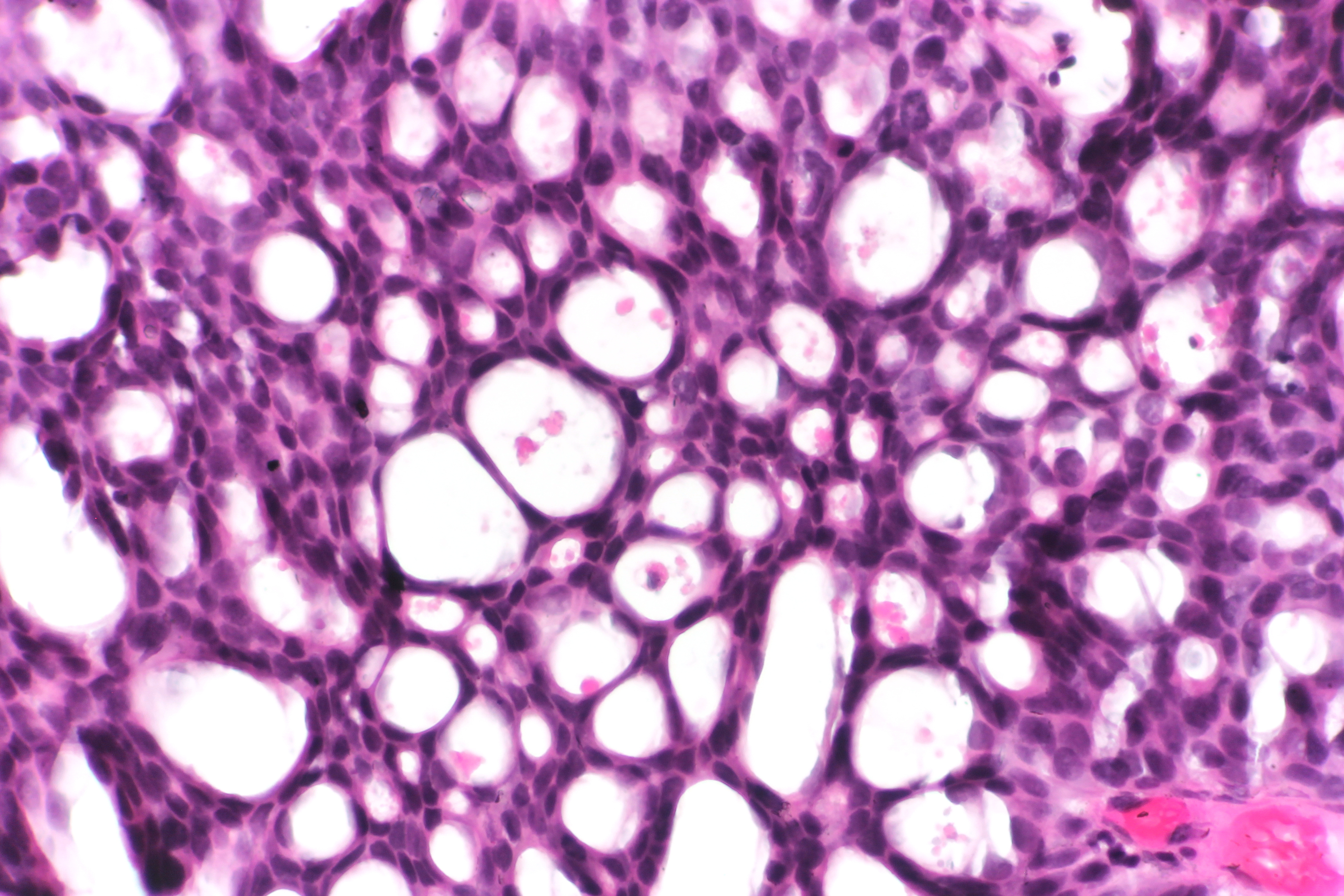
Cribriform: Solid with multiple clear spaces.

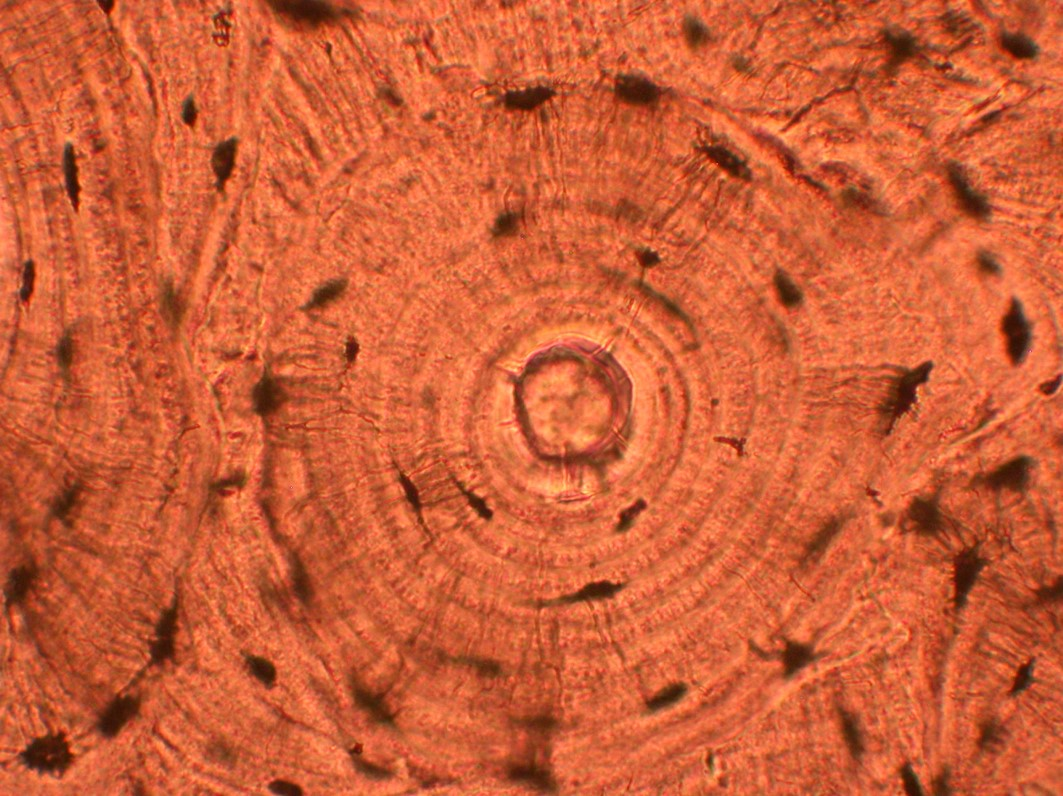
Whorled: Multiple concentric objects, or spiral-shaped

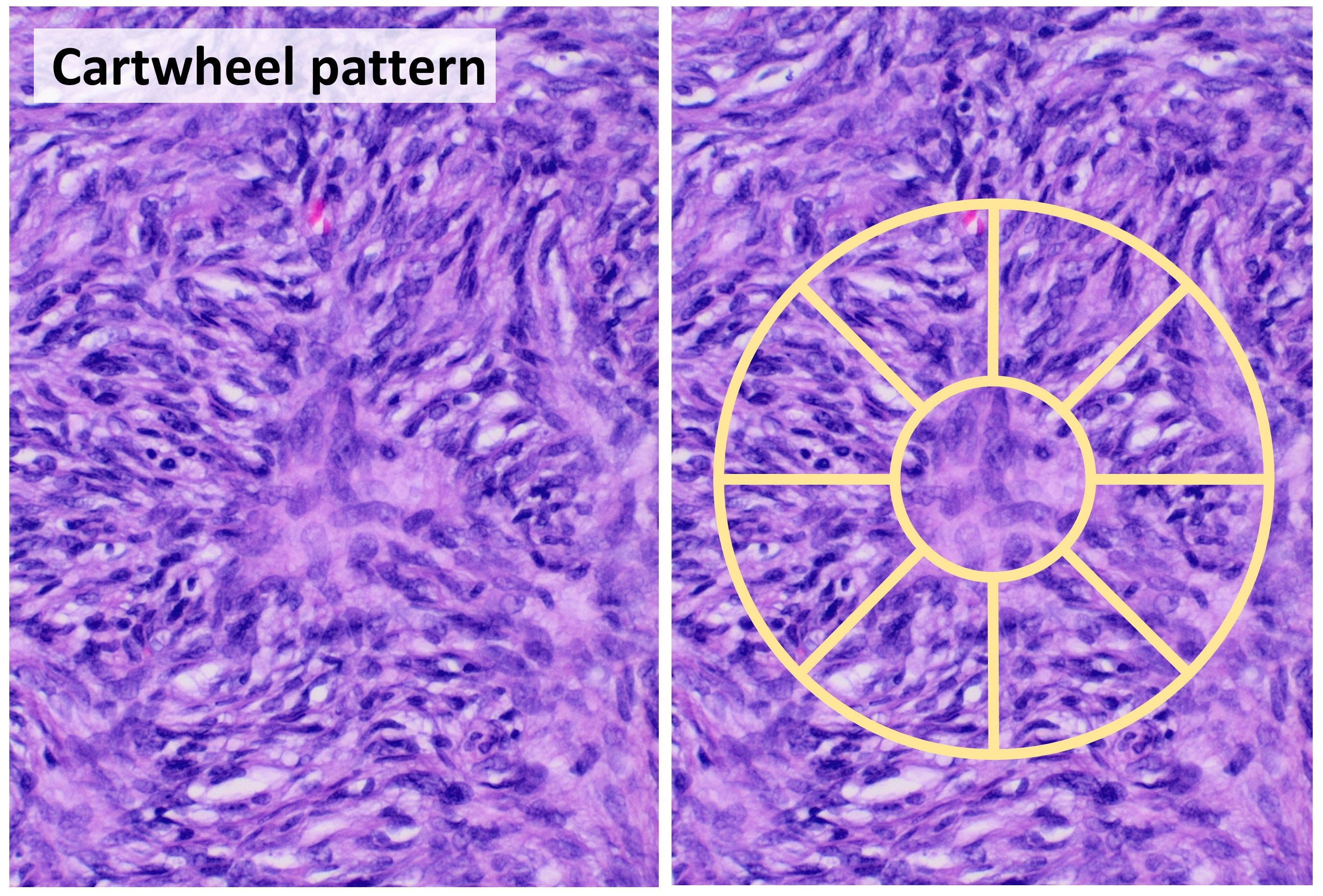
Cartwheel pattern: Center points that radiate cells or connective tissue outward

=== Nuclear patterns ===
Major nuclear patterns include:

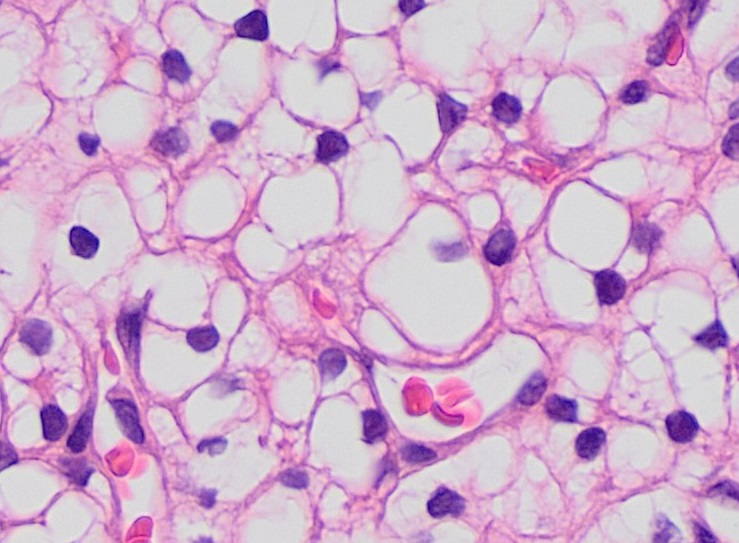
Monomorphic when having relatively similar sizes and shapes.

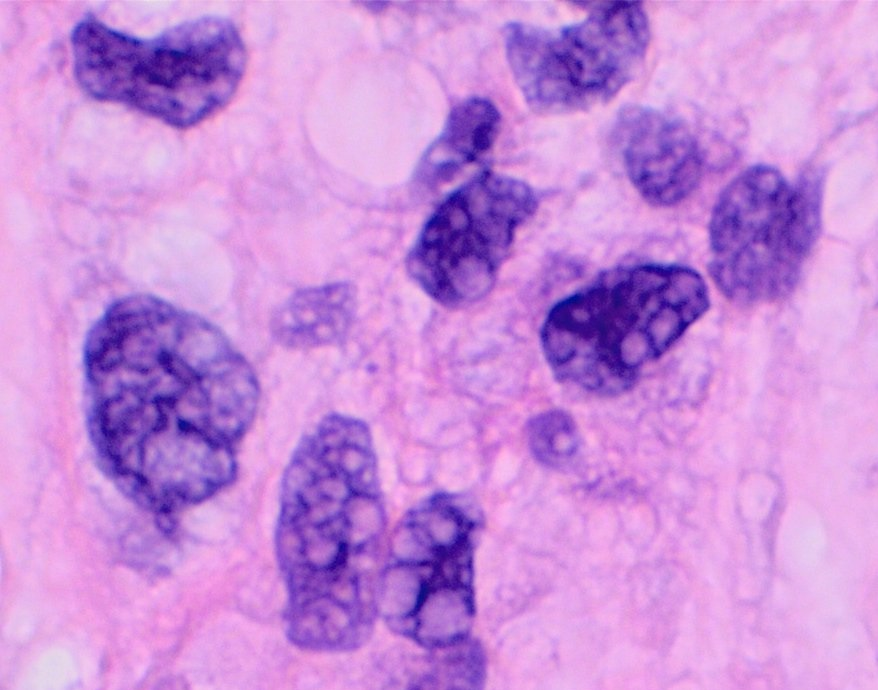
Pleomorphic when having different sizes and shapes. This often correlates with an increased nucleus to cytoplasm ratio. These features generally indicate malignancy.

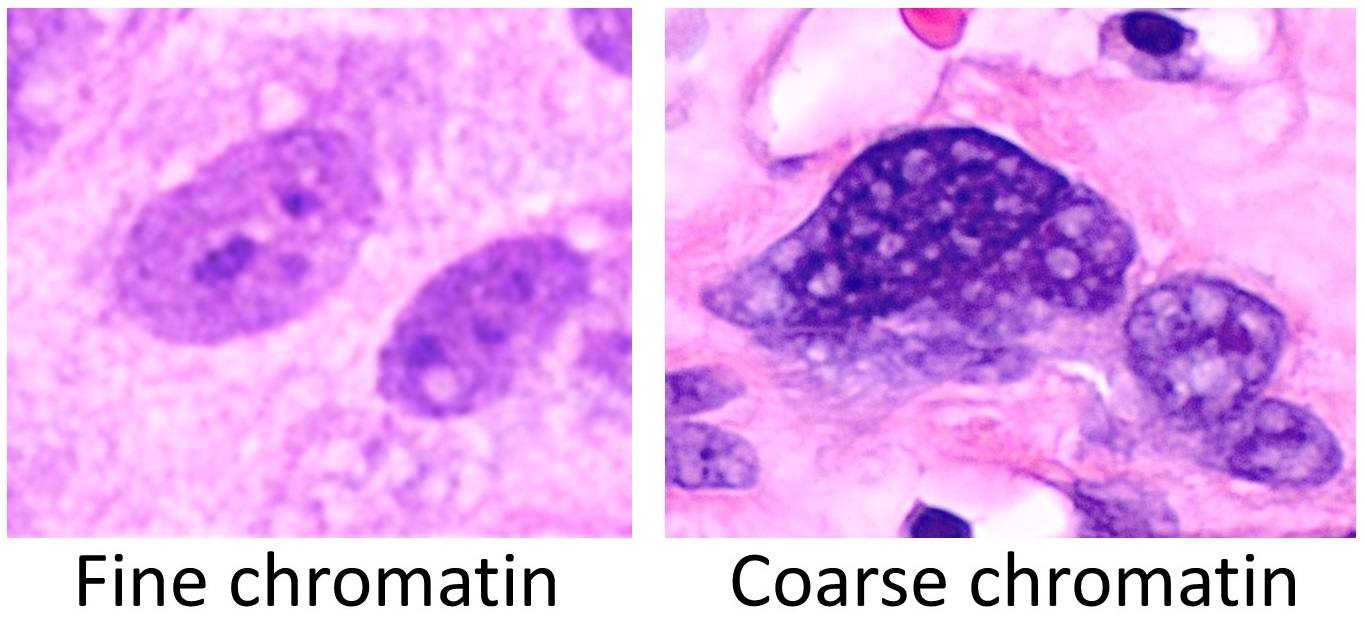
Fine chromatin when inconspicuous (essentially only nucleoli seen in the nuclei), versus coarse chromatin.

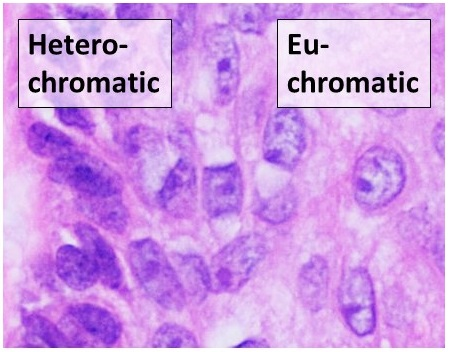
Sometimes "heterochromatic" versus "euchromatic" nuclei are used for visual appearance, but this strictly refers to the molecular structure of DNA.

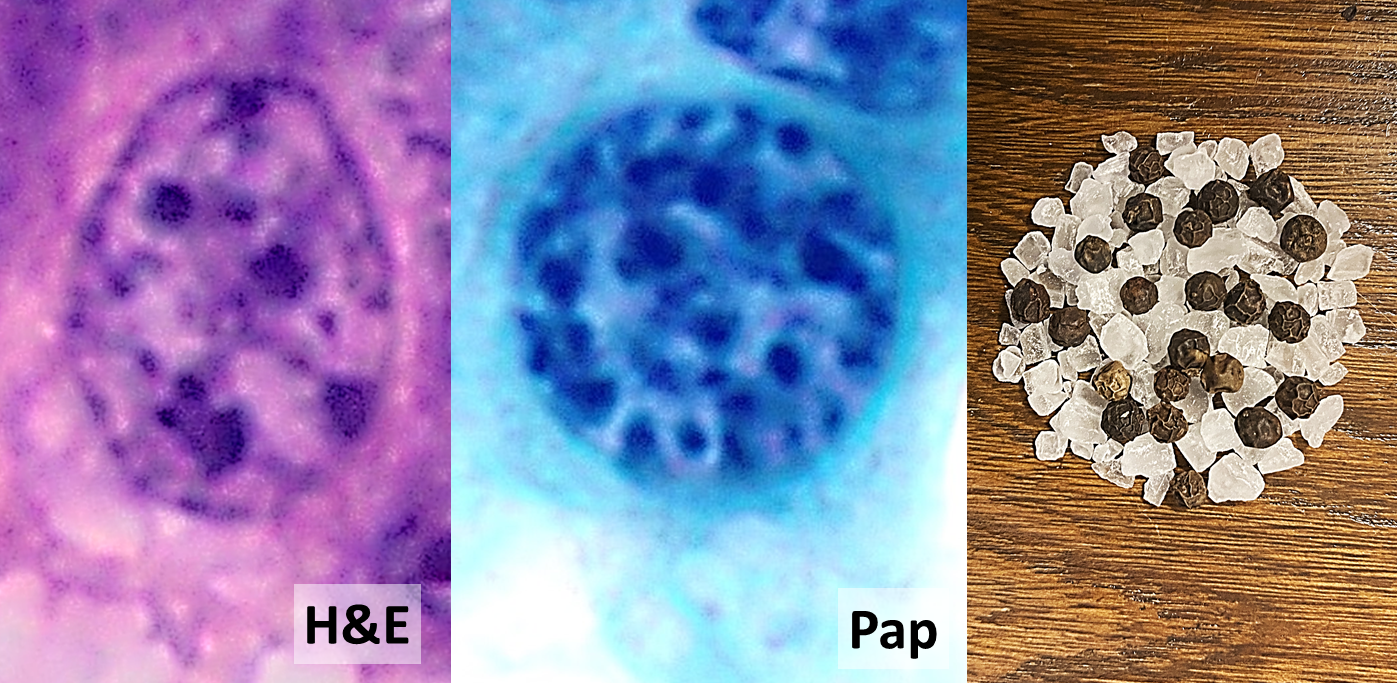
Granular "salt-and-pepper" chromatin.

== See also ==
- Anatomical pathology
- Molecular pathology
- Frozen section procedure
- Medical technologist
- Laser capture microdissection
- List of pathologists
