= Complete circumferential peripheral and deep margin assessment =

Cancer removal method

- Pictogram of margin-controlled histology (CCPDMA)
- Specialty: Dermatologist

Complete circumferential peripheral and deep margin assessment (CCPDMA) is the preferred method for the removal of certain cancers, especially skin cancers.

There are two forms of CCPDMA surgery: Mohs surgery and surgical excision coupled with margin assessment. Other examples of CCPDMA are found in classical pathology textbooks as techniques of cutting surgical specimens to allow the examination of the inferior and lateral margins of typically elliptical surgical specimens.

== Comparison to alternatives ==
CCPDMA is superior to standard bread loafing due to a very low false negative error rate. Bread loafing extrapolates the margin exam of a few representative slides to the entire surgical margin. CCPDMA allows for the near-complete examination of the surgical margin without statistical extrapolation and assumptions.

The first advantage of the CCPDMA method is that it allows for the complete examination of the entire surgical margin of the specimen. The second advantage is that the surgeon only has to remove a very small surgical margin. As CCPDMA surgery is frequently performed using frozen section pathology, immediate reporting of a positive surgical margin is made, and the tumor can be completely removed in the same day. Traditional pathology processing is called bread loafing, and only allows for partial examination of the surgical margin. Some surgeons send the specimen out for processing, and the result of the surgical margin assessment may not be made until days later.

CCPDMA is subject to the basic principles of histology sectioning. From a physical standpoint, the true margin is never assessed because a thin face margin has to be cut through in order to make the slide for examination. Therefore, a true and complete assessment of all margins is never achieved. Serial sectioning allows CCPDMA to approach near-complete evaluation of the surgical margin and may be performed by pathologists, dermatologists, and surgeons.

== Additional images ==
Comparing Mohs surgery to smashing an aluminum pie pan

How a Mohs section is flattened with relaxing incisions

False negative in standard bread loafing histology: If the pathologist looks only at the margin of the three narrow slices, the many cancerous cells on the discarded margins will be missed
