= Surgical oncology =

Field of treating cancer through surgery

Surgical Oncologist
Occupation
- Names: Physician; Surgeon
- Occupation type: Specialty
- Activity sectors: Medicine, Surgery

Description
- Education required: Master of Surgery (M.S./MCh); Doctor of Medicine (M.D.); Doctor of Osteopathic medicine (D.O.); Bachelor of Medicine, Bachelor of Surgery (M.B.B.S.); Bachelor of Medicine, Bachelor of Surgery (MBChB)
- Fields of employment: Hospitals, Clinics

Surgical oncology is the branch of surgery applied to oncology; it focuses on the surgical management of tumors, especially cancerous tumors.

As one of several modalities in the management of cancer, the specialty of surgical oncology has evolved in steps similar to medical oncology (pharmacotherapy for cancer), which grew out of hematology, and radiation oncology, which grew out of radiology. The Ewing Society—known today as the Society of Surgical Oncology—was started by surgeons interested in promoting the field of oncology. In 2011, the American Board of Surgery ratified Complex General Surgical Oncology via a specialty Board certification. The field was expected to continue expanding via the proliferation of cancer centers, as well as advanced minimally invasive techniques, palliative surgery, and neo-adjuvant treatments.

== Debate ==
Whether surgical oncology qualifies as a distinct medical specialty remains a topic of heated debate. Today, many agree that it is impractical for any single surgeon to be proficient in managing all types of malignant diseases. There are over 30 surgical oncology fellowship training programs in the United States that have been approved by the Society of Surgical Oncology. Although many general surgeons treat patients with malignant neoplasms, the term 'surgical oncologist' is typically reserved for surgeons who have completed approved fellowship training programs. However, this is a matter of semantics, as many surgeons who are thoroughly involved in treating cancer patients may consider themselves to be surgical oncologists.

Most often, surgical oncologist refers to a general surgical oncologist (a subspecialty of general surgery), but thoracic surgical oncologists, gynecologic oncologists and so forth can all be considered surgeons who specialize in treating cancer patients.

== Training ==
The importance of training surgeons who subspecialize in cancer surgery is supported by clinical trials showing that surgical oncology outcomes are positively correlated with surgeon volume. In other words, surgeons who treat more cancer cases tend to become more proficient, and their patients often experience improved survival rates. This is another controversial point, but it is generally accepted—even as common sense—that a surgeon who performs a given operation more often, will achieve superior results when compared with a surgeon who rarely performs the same procedure. This is particularly true of complex cancer resections such as, Breast Cancer Surgery, pancreaticoduodenectomy (Whipple procedure) for pancreatic cancer, and gastrectomy with extended (D2) lymphadenectomy for gastric cancer. In the United States and Canada, fellowship trained surgical oncologists have among the longest training periods of any physicians/surgeons. In some areas like Breast Diseases and Breast Cancer there we know as Breast Surgeon the specialist that only works with patients with breast diseases and breast cancer. A training period (clinical and research) of 6 to 8 years is typical and 8–10 years is not uncommon.

== Surgical oncology types and forms ==
These are the most common types and forms of oncological surgery:

- surgery to diagnose cancer
- surgery to stage cancer
- curative surgery
- radical surgery
- surgery to debulk cancer
- palliative surgery
- supportive surgery
- reconstructive surgery
- preventive (prophylactic) surgery.

== Surgical oncology techniques ==
Newer surgical techniques are less invasive, use different types of surgical instruments, and lead to less pain and shorter recovery times. The most effective surgical oncology techniques are:

- cryosurgery
- electrosurgery
- laparoscopic surgery
- laser surgery
- Mohs surgery
- radiofrequency ablation
- robotic surgery and other forms of surgery.
- thoracoscopic surgery

== Is this Curative? ==
People often ask if the surgery could cure their cancer, the answer is no. There is often another form of treatment that will be needed. The surgery could help with the removing the metastasis, but to "cure", or more commonly go into remission, you will often need the help of other treatments, such as radiation therapy, chemotherapy, immunotherapy, and targeted therapy. This approach could prevent the cancer from spreading, but there is always a chance that surgery helps the cancer spread.

In order for a surgery to be considered curative, the surgery needs to remove the cancerous tissue. There needs to be good margins, meaning that a small portion of healthy tissue is also taken, and sometimes lymph nodes near the cancer site. Even with the complete removal of the cancer, there is still a chance that cancerous cells remain, meaning the alternative methods are also needed.

== Books ==
One of the first textbooks dedicated to surgical oncology was written by the American-Irish surgeon, Theodore O'Connell in 1981. Many publications in surgical oncology are also appearing. The majority are large reference textbooks that seemingly combine specialties that are not generally practiced by a single practitioner but cover the academic subject. A number of practical handbooks such as "surgical oncology" in the well-read Oxford Handbooks series, have recently been published, perhaps alluding to the evolving practicality of this emerging discipline.
