= Resection margin =

Edge of tissue removed by surgery

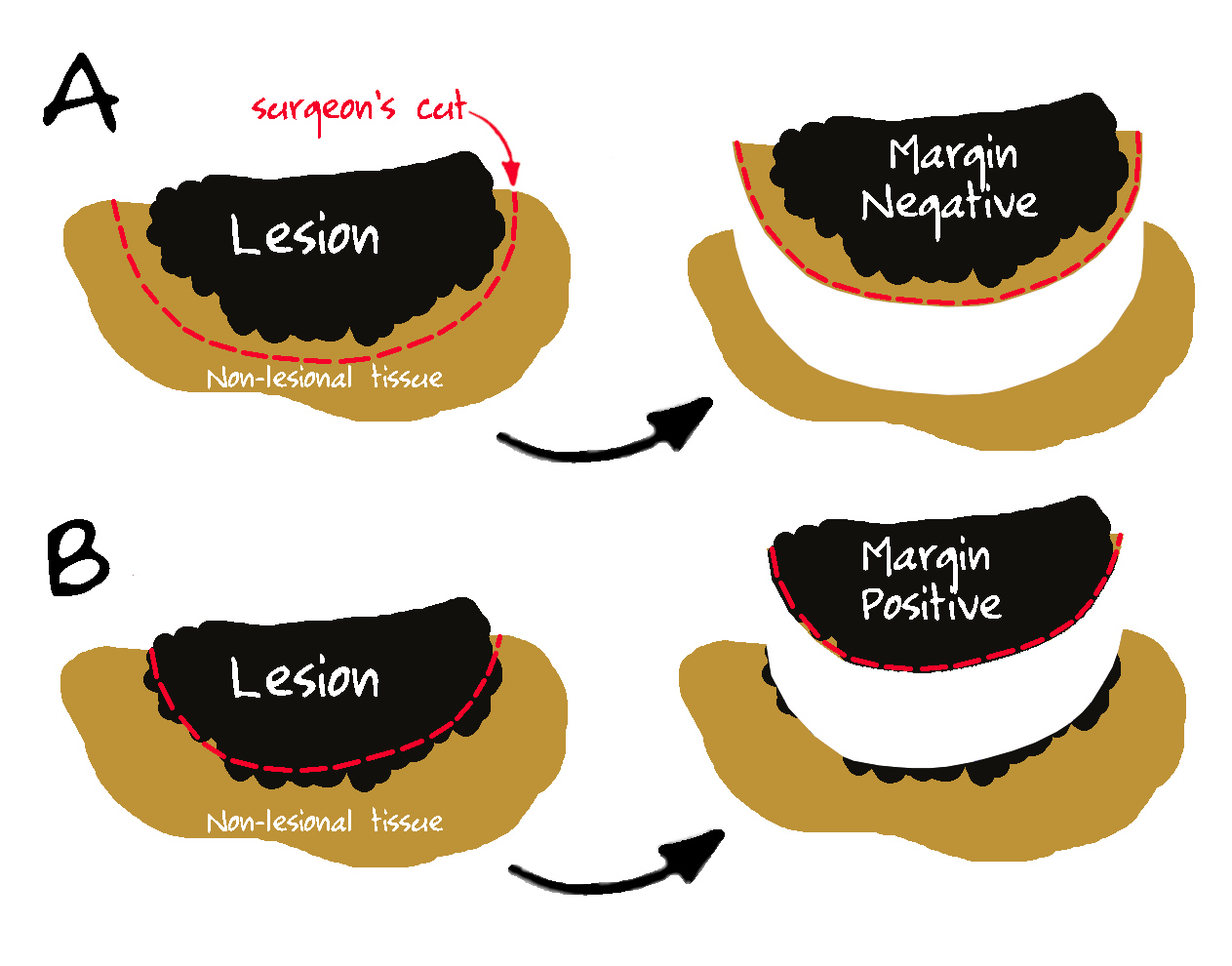
Schematic representation showing margin negative (A) and margin positive (B) excisions of a lesion. In a margin negative resection the lesion is completely removed; no lesional tissue is left behind in the patient. In a margin positive resection some lesional tissue is left behind in the patient.

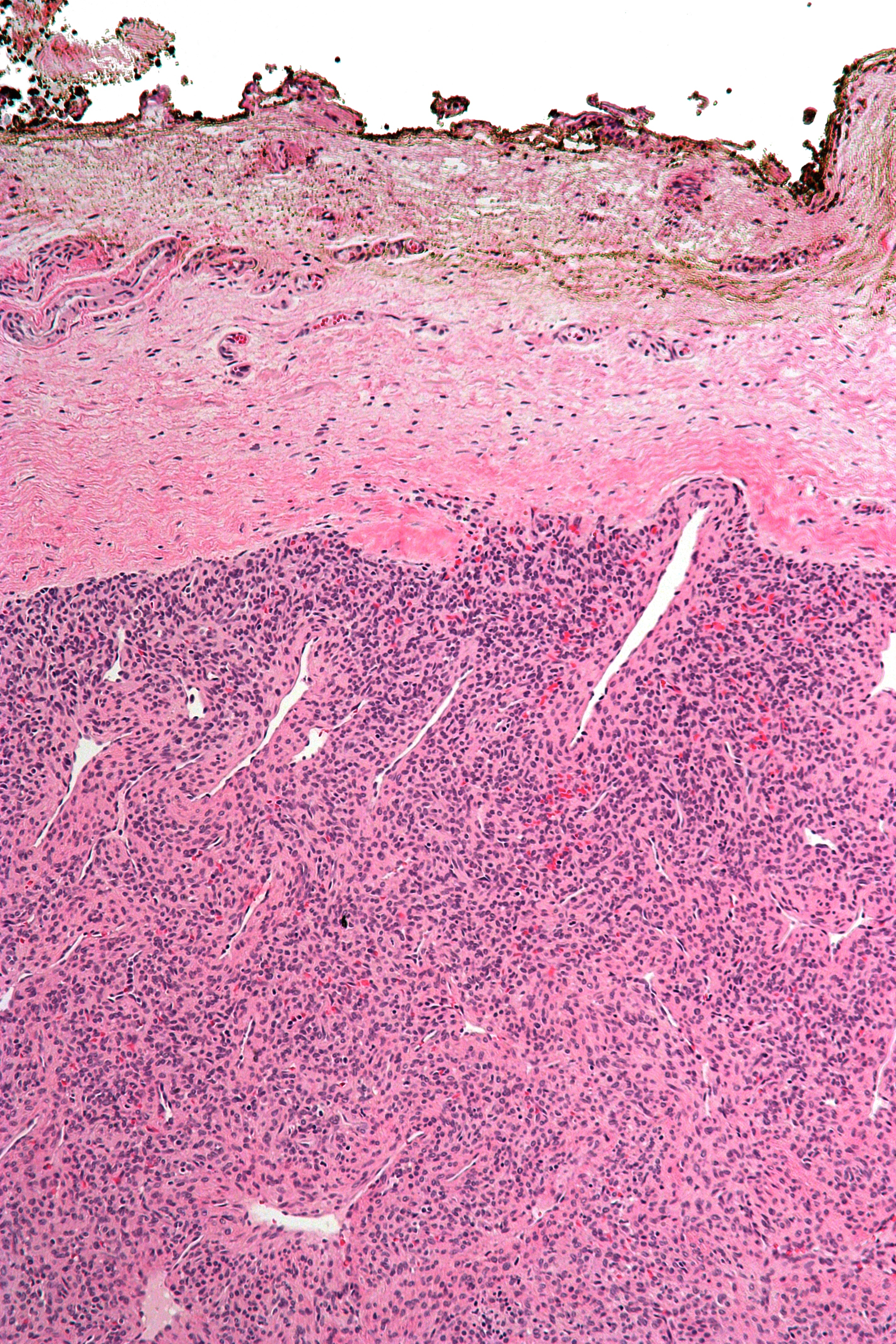
Micrograph of a stained slide of a resected myopericytoma, the resection margin stained brown

A resection margin or surgical margin is the edge or "margin" of apparently non-tumorous tissue around a tumor that has been surgically removed, called "resected", in surgical oncology. The resection is an attempt to remove a cancer tumor so that no portion of the malignant growth extends past the edges or margin of the removed tumor and surrounding tissue. These are retained after the surgery and examined microscopically by a pathologist to see if the margin is indeed free from tumor cells (called "negative"). If cancerous cells are found at the edges (called "positive") the surgery is much less likely to achieve the desired outcomes.

The size of the margin is an important issue in areas that are functionally important (i.e., large vessels like the aorta or vital organs) or in areas for which the extent of surgery is minimized due to aesthetic concerns (i.e., melanoma of the face or squamous cell carcinoma of the penis). The desired size of margin around the tumour can vary. In resections for breast cancer, there appears to be a difference between European and American radiation oncologists, with the former preferring larger margins of over 5 mm. Notably, in some clinical scenarios R1 margin can be considered as “planned” and is not associated with worse prognosis, e.g. in patient with diagnosis of well-differentiated liposarcoma.

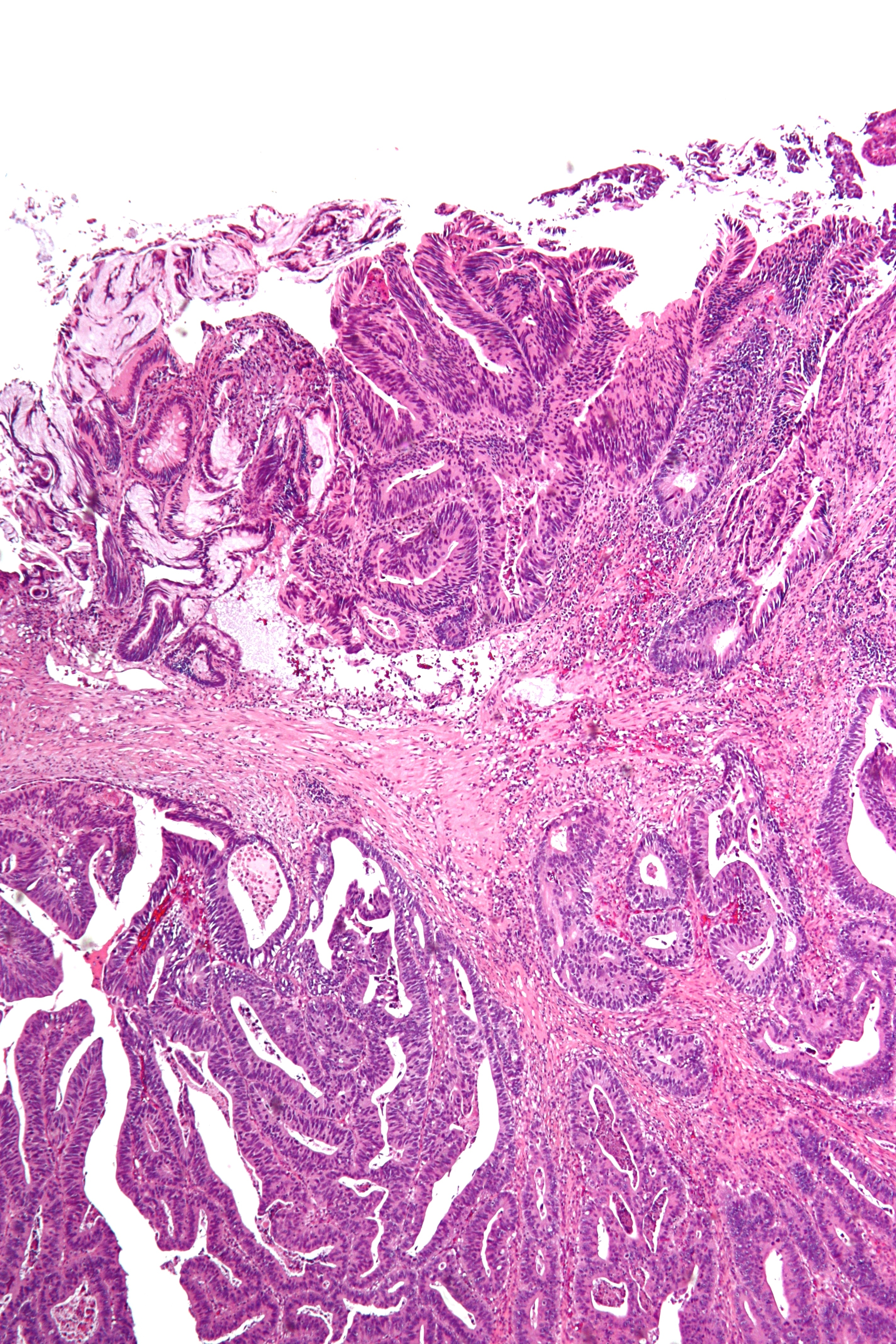
Micrograph showing a positive cauterized surgical margin in an adenocarcinoma (center-top of image). H&E stain.

Residual tumour at the primary site after treatment (it does not address the surgical margin as commonly believed) is classified by the pathologist as (AJCC 8th Edition):

- R0 - no cancer cells seen microscopically at the primary tumour site.
- R1 - cancer cells present microscopically at the primary tumour site.
- R2 - Macroscopic residual tumour at primary cancer site or regional lymph nodes. It does not include metastatic disease identified but not sampled at the time of surgery.

The Margin Status following tumour resection (AJCC 8th Edition):

- Negative margin: No tumour at the margin.
- Microscopic positive margin: Tumour identified microscopically at the margin.
- Macroscopic positive margin: Tumour identified grossly at the margin.
- Margin not assessed.

Apart from traditional methods looking at stained "shaves" (thin slices of tissue removed from the edge of the margin) or smeared and stained imprints, more recent techniques used to assess margins include x-rays with compression, frozen specimens, and new techniques such as intraoperative fluorescence imaging, Raman spectroscopy, optical coherence tomography and quantitative diffuse reflectance spectroscopy.

== Definition ==
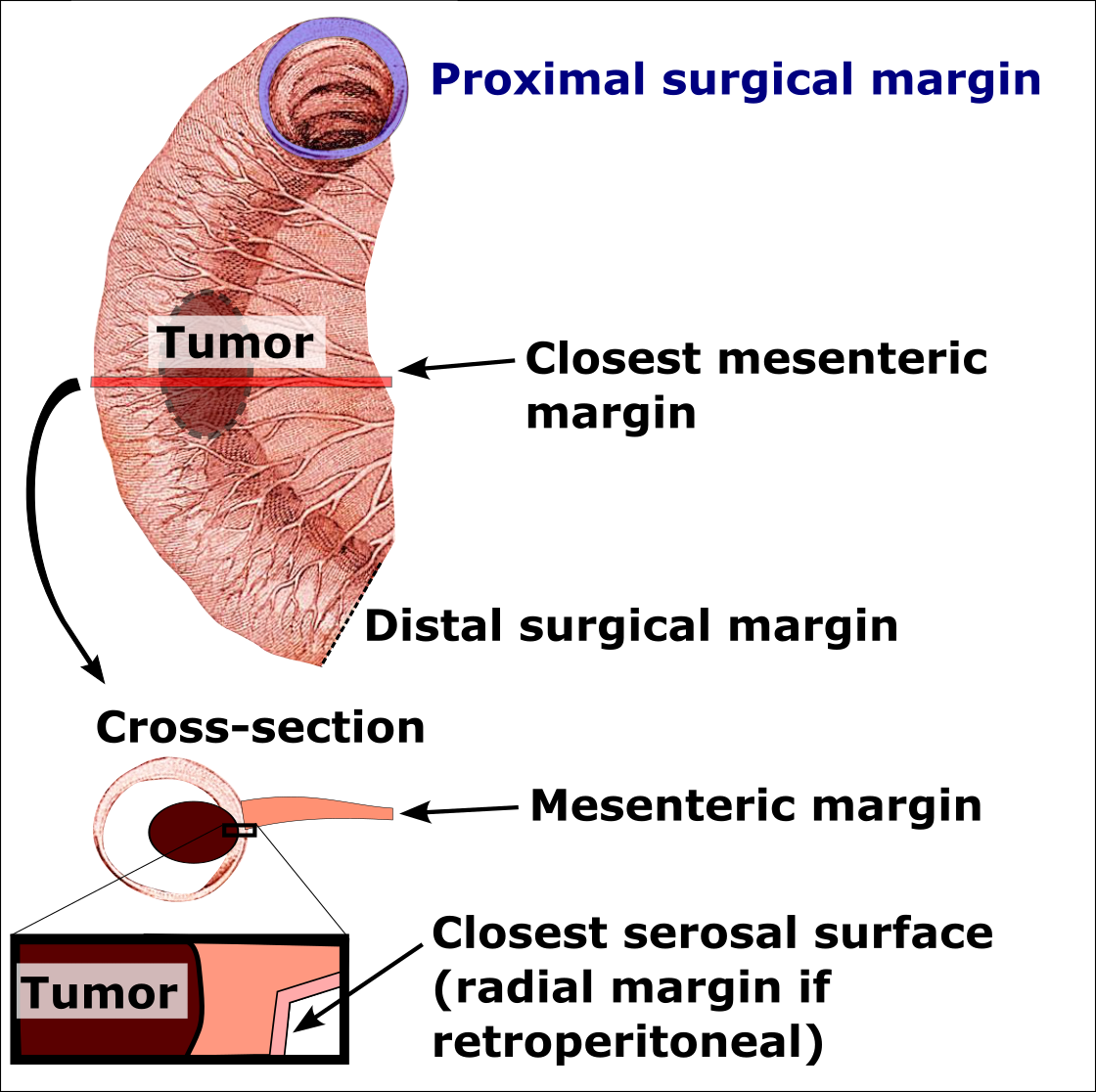
Edges and margins for an intestinal tumor.

Surgical margin in a surgery report defines the visible margin or free edge of "normal" tissue seen by the surgeon with the naked eye. Surgical margin as read in a pathology report defines the histological measurement of normal or unaffected tissue surrounding the visible tumor under a microscope on a glass mounted histology section. A "narrow" surgical margin implies that the tumor exists very close to the surgical margin, and a "wide" surgical margin implies the tumor exists far from the cut edge or the surgical margin. Narrow surgical margin using the bread loafing technique suggests that residual cancer might be left due to false negative error. A surgeon often will perform a second surgery if a narrow surgical margin is noted on a pathology report.

== Associated errors and recurrence rate ==
This determination is made with the full understanding of "false negative error" intrinsic in the bread loafing technique of histology (also known as POMA - a term used by the NCCN). The higher the false negative error is, the higher the recurrence rate of a cancer or tumor at the surgical margin. This is due to the misreading of a pathology specimen as being clear of residual tumor when there is actually residual tumor left where the specimen was not cut and mounted on the histology slide. The "false negative error" is very low in the CCPDMA method of histology processing, and can be very high in the bread loafing (POMA) method of histology processing. In the bread loafing method of processing, one will note a high false negative error rate with narrow surgical margin; and one will note a low false negative error with a wide surgical margin Surgical margin has a much less significant effect on the false negative error rate of CCPDMA methods, allowing the surgeon to routinely use very narrow surgical margins (1 to 2 mm for non-melanoma skin cancer). The worldwide extent of inadequate resection of the tumor is illustrated in following Table showing the percentage of positive surgical margins for the most common cancer types.

Percentage of positive surgical margins for the most common cancer types (estimated new cases worldwide, 2020) *Males and females combined
| Cancer type (solid tumours only) | Estimated new cases * | Incidence * | Positive margins |
|---|---|---|---|
| Breast | 2,261,419 | 12% | 20–70% |
| Trachea, lung, and bronchus | 2,206,771 | 11% | 5–17% |
| Prostate | 1,414,259 | 7% | 7–75% |
| Colorectal | 1,931,590 | 10% | 12–58% |
| Urinary bladder | 573,278 | 3% | 0–25% |
| Kidney and renal pelvis | 431,288 | 2% | 7–11% |
| Uterine corpus | 417,367 | 2% | 4–17% |
| Pancreas | 495,773 | 3% | 18–85% |
| Thyroid | 586,202 | 3% | 10–11% |
| Lip, oral cavity | 377,713 | 2% | 5–43% |
