= Palliative surgery =

Intervention to reduce symptoms

Palliative surgery is surgical intervention targeted to make a patient’s symptoms less severe, thus make the patient’s quality of life better despite negligible impact on the patient’s survival. Palliative surgery focuses on supplying the greatest benefit to the patient using the least invasive intervention. Palliative surgery provides symptom relief and preservation of the quality of life in terminal disease states. The uses of palliative surgery can range from extensive debulking operations to less complex operations.

The main purposes of palliative surgery are: evaluation of the extent of the disease, control of locoregional spread, control of a fungating tumour, discharge or haemorrhage, control of pain, surgical reconstruction or rehabilitation to improve quality of life.
