= Mitotic index =

Fraction of cells undergoing mitosis in a population

In cell biology, the mitotic index is defined as the ratio between the number of a population's cells undergoing mitosis to its total number of cells.

== Purpose ==
The mitotic index is a measure of cellular proliferation.

It is defined as the percentage of cells undergoing mitosis in a given population of cells. Mitosis is the division of somatic cells into two daughter cells. Durations of the cell cycle and mitosis vary in different cell types. An elevated mitotic index indicates more cells are dividing. In cancer cells, the mitotic index may be elevated compared to normal growth of tissues or cellular repair of the site of an injury. The mitotic index is therefore an important prognostic factor predicting both overall survival and response to chemotherapy in most types of cancer. It may lose much of its predictive value for elderly populations. For example, a low mitotic index loses any prognostic value for women over 70 years old with breast cancer.

== Calculation ==
The mitotic index is the number of cells undergoing mitosis divided by the total number of cells.

Counting the total number of cells is of course laborious. In a clinical setting, and where the intention is only to compare observations rather than to state an index, informal alternatives may be used: for example "12 mitotic figures are noted per 10 high power [microscopic] fields" in contrast with "4 mitotic figures noted per 50 high power fields." (Mitotic figures are cells recognisably in mitotic configuration.)

== Formula ==
$\mbox{Mitotic index} = \frac{P + M + A + T}{N} \times 100$

where P, M, A, and T are the number of cells in prophase, metaphase, anaphase, and telophase respectively, and N is the total number of cells.

== Examples ==
The fastest rate of mitosis happens in the zygote, embryo and infant stage for humans and animals because mitosis is essential for embryological development. Mitosis is also required at a higher rate to grow and repair tissue. Some examples include human lymph nodes and bone marrow. Also, skin, hair, and the cells lining the intestines (epithelial cells) have high rates of mitosis. That's because those tissues constantly need to be repaired (by the cells being replaced) or growing. Plants have higher rates of mitosis at the cells of the shoot and root tips.
