= List of MeSH codes (C04) =

The following is a complete list of the "C04" Neoplasms codes from the Medical Subject Headings (MeSH) structure, as defined by the United States National Library of Medicine (NLM).

This list continues the information from List of MeSH codes (C03). Codes following these are found at List of MeSH codes (C05). For other MeSH codes, see List of MeSH codes.

The source for this content is the set of 2026 MeSH Trees from the NLM.

== MeSH C04 – neoplasms ==
=== MeSH C04.182 – cysts ===
==== MeSH C04.182.089 – bone cysts ====
- MeSH C04.182.089.265 – bone cysts, aneurysmal
- MeSH C04.182.089.530 – Cysts of the jaws
  - MeSH C04.182.089.530.660 – nonodontogenic cysts
  - MeSH C04.182.089.530.690 – odontogenic cysts
    - MeSH C04.182.089.530.690.150 – basal cell nevus syndrome
    - MeSH C04.182.089.530.690.310 – dentigerous cyst
    - MeSH C04.182.089.530.690.605 – odontogenic cyst, calcifying
    - MeSH C04.182.089.530.690.790 – Lateral periodontal cyst
      - MeSH C04.182.089.530.690.790.820 – radicular cyst

==== MeSH C04.182.612 – ovarian cysts ====
- MeSH C04.182.612.765 – polyendocrine metabolic ovarian syndrome

==== MeSH C04.182.640 – pancreatic cyst ====
- MeSH C04.182.640.692 – pancreatic pseudocyst

==== MeSH C04.182.867 – synovial cyst ====
- MeSH C04.182.867.500 – popliteal cyst

=== MeSH C04.445 – hamartoma ===
==== MeSH C04.445.435 – hamartoma syndrome, multiple ====
- MeSH C04.445.435.500 – proteus syndrome

=== MeSH C04.557 – neoplasms by histologic type ===
==== MeSH C04.557.227 – histiocytic disorders, malignant ====
- MeSH C04.557.227.001 – Blastic Plasmacytoid Dendritic Cell Neoplasm
- MeSH C04.557.227.190 – Dendritic Cell Sarcoma, Follicular
- MeSH C04.557.227.199 – Dendritic Cell Sarcoma, Interdigitating
- MeSH C04.557.227.380 – Histiocytic Sarcoma
- MeSH C04.557.227.500 – Langerhans Cell Sarcoma

==== MeSH C04.557.337 – leukemia ====
- MeSH C04.557.337.001 – Blastic Plasmacytoid Dendritic Cell Neoplasm
- MeSH C04.557.337.100 – enzootic bovine leukosis
- MeSH C04.557.337.372 – leukemia, experimental
  - MeSH C04.557.337.372.216 – avian leukosis
  - MeSH C04.557.337.372.594 – leukemia L1210
  - MeSH C04.557.337.372.602 – leukemia L5178
  - MeSH C04.557.337.372.782 – leukemia p388
- MeSH C04.557.337.385 – leukemia, feline
- MeSH C04.557.337.415 – leukemia, hairy cell
- MeSH C04.557.337.428 – leukemia, lymphoid
  - MeSH C04.557.337.428.080 – leukemia, b-cell
    - MeSH C04.557.337.428.080.125 – Leukemia, Lymphocytic, Chronic, B-Cell
    - MeSH C04.557.337.428.080.562 – Leukemia, Prolymphocytic, B-Cell
  - MeSH C04.557.337.428.100 – Leukemia, Biphenotypic, Acute
  - MeSH C04.557.337.428.565 – leukemia, prolymphocytic
    - MeSH C04.557.337.428.565.745 – Leukemia, Prolymphocytic, B-Cell
    - MeSH C04.557.337.428.565.750 – Leukemia, Prolymphocytic, T-Cell
  - MeSH C04.557.337.428.580 – leukemia, T-Cell
    - MeSH C04.557.337.428.580.049 – Leukemia, Large Granular Lymphocytic
    - MeSH C04.557.337.428.580.075 – Leukemia, Prolymphocytic, T-Cell
    - MeSH C04.557.337.428.580.100 – Leukemia-Lymphoma, Adult T-Cell
  - MeSH C04.557.337.428.600 – Precursor Cell Lymphoblastic Leukemia-Lymphoma
    - MeSH C04.557.337.428.600.600 – Precursor B-Cell Lymphoblastic Leukemia-Lymphoma
    - MeSH C04.557.337.428.600.620 – Precursor T-Cell Lymphoblastic Leukemia-Lymphoma
- MeSH C04.557.337.440 – leukemia, mast-cell
- MeSH C04.557.337.539 – leukemia, myeloid
  - MeSH C04.557.337.539.250 – Leukemia, Myelogenous, Chronic, BCR-ABL Positive
    - MeSH C04.557.337.539.250.100 – Blast Crisis
    - MeSH C04.557.337.539.250.300 – Leukemia, Myeloid, Accelerated Phase
    - MeSH C04.557.337.539.250.400 – Leukemia, Myeloid, Chronic-Phase
  - MeSH C04.557.337.539.275 – Leukemia, Myeloid, Acute
    - MeSH C04.557.337.539.275.125 – Leukemia, Basophilic, Acute
    - MeSH C04.557.337.539.275.300 – Leukemia, Eosinophilic, Acute
    - MeSH C04.557.337.539.275.325 – Leukemia, Erythroblastic, Acute
    - MeSH C04.557.337.539.275.440 – Leukemia, Mast-Cell
    - MeSH C04.557.337.539.275.450 – Leukemia, Megakaryoblastic, Acute
    - MeSH C04.557.337.539.275.484 – Leukemia, Monocytic, Acute
    - MeSH C04.557.337.539.275.700 – Leukemia, Promyelocytic, Acute
  - MeSH C04.557.337.539.300 – Leukemia, Myeloid, Chronic, Atypical, BCR-ABL Negative
  - MeSH C04.557.337.539.520 – Leukemia, Myelomonocytic, Acute
  - MeSH C04.557.337.539.522 – Leukemia, Myelomonocytic, Chronic
  - MeSH C04.557.337.539.525 – Leukemia, Myelomonocytic, Juvenile
  - MeSH C04.557.337.539.775 – Sarcoma, Myeloid
- MeSH C04.557.337.595 – Leukemia, Plasma Cell
- MeSH C04.557.337.650 – leukemia, radiation-induced

==== MeSH C04.557.375 – Neoplasm, Lymphatic Tissue ====
- MeSH C04.557.375.450 – lymphangioma
  - MeSH C04.557.375.450.450 – lymphangioma, cystic
- MeSH C04.557.375.460 – lymphangiomyoma
  - MeSH C04.557.375.460.465 – lymphangioleiomyomatosis
- MeSH C04.557.375.480 – lymphangiosarcoma

==== MeSH C04.557.386 – lymphoma ====
- MeSH C04.557.386.001 – Blastic Plasmacytoid Dendritic Cell Neoplasm
- MeSH C04.557.386.150 – Composite Lymphoma
- MeSH C04.557.386.355 – Hodgkin Disease
- MeSH C04.557.386.390 – Immunoproliferative Small Intestinal Disease
- MeSH C04.557.386.435 – Intraocular Lymphoma
- MeSH C04.557.386.480 – lymphoma, non-hodgkin
  - MeSH C04.557.386.480.150 – Lymphoma, B-Cell
    - MeSH C04.557.386.480.150.165 – burkitt lymphoma
    - MeSH C04.557.386.480.150.450 – lymphoma, aids-related
    - MeSH C04.557.386.480.150.570 – lymphoma, mucosa-associated lymphoid tissue
    - MeSH C04.557.386.480.150.585 – Lymphoma, Large B-Cell, Diffuse
      - MeSH C04.557.386.480.150.585.500 – Plasmablastic Lymphoma
    - MeSH C04.557.386.480.150.592 – Lymphoma, Primary Effusion
    - MeSH C04.557.386.480.150.600 – Lymphomatoid Granulomatosis
  - MeSH C04.557.386.480.350 – lymphoma, follicular
  - MeSH C04.557.386.480.493 – Lymphoma, Large-Cell, Immunoblastic
  - MeSH C04.557.386.480.525 – Lymphoma, Mantle-Cell
  - MeSH C04.557.386.480.750 – lymphoma, t-cell
    - MeSH C04.557.386.480.750.099 – Enteropathy-Associated T-Cell Lymphoma
    - MeSH C04.557.386.480.750.199 – Lymphoma, Extranodal NK-T-Cell
    - MeSH C04.557.386.480.750.399 – Lymphoma, Large-Cell, Anaplastic
    - MeSH C04.557.386.480.750.800 – lymphoma, t-cell, cutaneous
      - MeSH C04.557.386.480.750.800.507 – Lymphoma, Primary Cutaneous Anaplastic Large Cell
      - MeSH C04.557.386.480.750.800.528 – Lymphomatoid Papulosis
      - MeSH C04.557.386.480.750.800.550 – Mycosis Fungoides
        - MeSH C04.557.386.480.750.800.550.600 – Pagetoid Reticulosis
      - MeSH C04.557.386.480.750.800.775 – Sezary Syndrome
    - MeSH C04.557.386.480.750.825 – lymphoma, t-cell, peripheral

==== MeSH C04.557.435 – neoplasms, complex and mixed ====
- MeSH C04.557.435.075 – adenolymphoma
- MeSH C04.557.435.090 – adenoma, pleomorphic
- MeSH C04.557.435.108 – Adenomyoepithelioma
- MeSH C04.557.435.110 – adenomyoma
- MeSH C04.557.435.135 – adenosarcoma
- MeSH C04.557.435.250 – carcinoma, adenosquamous
- MeSH C04.557.435.290 – carcinosarcoma
  - MeSH C04.557.435.290.210 – Carcinoma+256,+Walker
- MeSH C04.557.435.290.295 – Composite Lymphoma
- MeSH C04.557.435.380 – hepatoblastoma
- MeSH C04.557.435.500 – mesenchymoma
- MeSH C04.557.435.525 – mixed tumor, malignant
- MeSH C04.557.435.530 – mixed tumor, mesodermal
- MeSH C04.557.435.540 – mixed tumor, Müllerian
- MeSH C04.557.435.585 – myoepithelioma
- MeSH C04.557.435.595 – wilms tumor
  - MeSH C04.557.435.595.220 – Denys-Drash Syndrome
  - MeSH C04.557.435.595.950 – WAGR Syndrome
- MeSH C04.557.435.600 – nephroma, mesoblastic
- MeSH C04.557.435.675 – pulmonary blastoma
- MeSH C04.557.435.710 – rhabdoid tumor
- MeSH C04.557.435.775 – sarcoma, endometrial stromal
- MeSH C04.557.435.850 – thymoma

==== MeSH C04.557.450 – neoplasms, connective and soft tissue ====
- MeSH C04.557.450.550 – neoplasms, adipose tissue
  - MeSH C04.557.450.550.100 – angiolipoma
  - MeSH C04.557.450.550.125 – angiomyolipoma
  - MeSH C04.557.450.550.400 – lipoma
    - MeSH C04.557.450.550.400.500 – Lipoblastoma
  - MeSH C04.557.450.550.420 – liposarcoma
    - MeSH C04.557.450.550.420.425 – liposarcoma, myxoid
  - MeSH C04.557.450.550.710 – myelolipoma
- MeSH C04.557.450.565 – neoplasms, connective tissue
  - MeSH C04.557.450.565.250 – chondroblastoma
  - MeSH C04.557.450.565.265 – chondroma
    - MeSH C04.557.450.565.265.270 – chondromatosis
  - MeSH C04.557.450.565.280 – chondrosarcoma
    - MeSH C04.557.450.565.280.140 – Chondrosarcoma, Clear Cell
    - MeSH C04.557.450.565.280.280 – chondrosarcoma, mesenchymal
  - MeSH C04.557.450.565.325 – Endometrial Stromal Tumors
  - MeSH C04.557.450.565.370 – Gastrointestinal Stromal Tumors
  - MeSH C04.557.450.565.380 – giant cell tumors
    - MeSH C04.557.450.565.380.380 – giant cell tumor of bone
    - MeSH C04.557.450.565.380.690 – Giant Cell Tumor of Tendon Sheath
      - MeSH C04.557.450.565.380.690.500 – Synovitis, Pigmented Villonodular
  - MeSH C04.557.450.565.465 – mastocytosis
    - MeSH C04.557.450.565.465.124 – Mast-Cell Sarcoma
    - MeSH C04.557.450.565.465.249 – mastocytoma
      - MeSH C04.557.450.565.465.249.500 – Mastocytoma, Skin
    - MeSH C04.557.450.565.465.500 – mastocytosis, cutaneous
      - MeSH C04.557.450.565.465.500.500 – Mastocytoma, Skin
      - MeSH C04.557.450.565.465.500.850 – Urticaria Pigmentosa
    - MeSH C04.557.450.565.465.750 – mastocytosis, systemic
  - MeSH C04.557.450.565.540 – myofibroma
  - MeSH C04.557.450.565.545 – Myopericytoma
  - MeSH C04.557.450.565.550 – myxoma
    - MeSH C04.557.450.565.550.312 – Carney Complex
    - MeSH C04.557.450.565.550.625 – neurothekeoma
  - MeSH C04.557.450.565.560 – myxosarcoma
  - MeSH C04.557.450.565.575 – neoplasms, bone tissue
    - MeSH C04.557.450.565.575.400 – Fibroma, Ossifying
    - MeSH C04.557.450.565.575.420 – Giant Cell Tumor of Bone
    - MeSH C04.557.450.565.575.600 – osteoblastoma
    - MeSH C04.557.450.565.575.610 – osteochondroma
      - MeSH C04.557.450.565.575.610.615 – osteochondromatosis
        - MeSH C04.557.450.565.575.610.615.325 – exostoses, multiple hereditary
    - MeSH C04.557.450.565.575.625 – osteoma
      - MeSH C04.557.450.565.575.625.625 – osteoma, osteoid
    - MeSH C04.557.450.565.575.650 – osteosarcoma
      - MeSH C04.557.450.565.575.650.655 – osteosarcoma, juxtacortical
      - MeSH C04.557.450.565.575.650.800 – sarcoma, Ewing's
  - MeSH C04.557.450.565.590 – neoplasms, fibrous tissue
    - MeSH C04.557.450.565.590.340 – fibroma
      - MeSH C04.557.450.565.590.340.173 – Dupuytren Contracture
      - MeSH C04.557.450.565.590.340.345 – fibroma, desmoplastic
      - MeSH C04.557.450.565.590.340.360 – fibroma, ossifying
      - MeSH C04.557.450.565.590.340.400 – fibromatosis, abdominal
      - MeSH C04.557.450.565.590.340.410 – Desmoid Tumors
      - MeSH C04.557.450.565.590.340.705 – Fibromatosis, Plantar
    - MeSH C04.557.450.565.590.350 – fibrosarcoma
      - MeSH C04.557.450.565.590.350.320 – dermatofibrosarcoma
      - MeSH C04.557.450.565.590.350.590 – neurofibrosarcoma
    - MeSH C04.557.450.565.590.425 – histiocytoma
      - MeSH C04.557.450.565.590.425.350 – histiocytoma, benign fibrous
      - MeSH C04.557.450.565.590.425.360 – histiocytoma, malignant fibrous
    - MeSH C04.557.450.565.590.550 – myofibromatosis
    - MeSH C04.557.450.565.590.595 – neoplasms, fibroepithelial
      - MeSH C04.557.450.565.590.595.050 – adenofibroma
        - MeSH C04.557.450.565.590.595.050.500 – Cystadenofibroma
      - MeSH C04.557.450.565.590.595.150 – brenner tumor
      - MeSH C04.557.450.565.590.595.350 – fibroadenoma
    - MeSH C04.557.450.565.590.797 – Solitary Fibrous Tumors
      - MeSH C04.557.450.565.590.797.750 – Solitary Fibrous Tumor, Pleural
  - MeSH C04.557.450.565.800 – sarcoma, clear cell
  - MeSH C04.557.450.565.825 – sarcoma, small cell
  - MeSH C04.557.450.565.835 – sarcoma, synovial
- MeSH C04.557.450.590 – neoplasms, muscle tissue
  - MeSH C04.557.450.590.350 – granular cell tumor
  - MeSH C04.557.450.590.450 – leiomyoma
    - MeSH C04.557.450.590.450.125 – angiomyoma
    - MeSH C04.557.450.590.450.455 – Leiomyoma, Epithelioid
    - MeSH C04.557.450.590.450.465 – Leiomyomatosis
  - MeSH C04.557.450.590.455 – Leiomyosarcoma
  - MeSH C04.557.450.590.540 – myoma
    - MeSH C04.557.450.590.540.700 – rhabdomyoma
  - MeSH C04.557.450.590.550 – myosarcoma
    - MeSH C04.557.450.590.550.660 – rhabdomyosarcoma
      - MeSH C04.557.450.590.550.660.665 – rhabdomyosarcoma, alveolar
      - MeSH C04.557.450.590.550.660.675 – rhabdomyosarcoma, embryonal
  - MeSH C04.557.450.590.775 – sarcoma, alveolar soft part
  - MeSH C04.557.450.590.800 – smooth muscle tumor
- MeSH C04.557.450.692 – Perivascular Epithelioid Cell Neoplasms
  - MeSH C04.557.450.692.249 – Angiomyolipoma
  - MeSH C04.557.450.692.500 – Lymphangioleiomyomatosis
- MeSH C04.557.450.795 – sarcoma
  - MeSH C04.557.450.795.135 – adenosarcoma
  - MeSH C04.557.450.795.290 – carcinosarcoma
    - MeSH C04.557.450.795.290.210 – carcinoma 256, walker
  - MeSH C04.557.450.795.300 – chondrosarcoma
    - MeSH C04.557.450.795.300.140 – Chondrosarcoma, Clear Cell
    - MeSH C04.557.450.795.300.280 – chondrosarcoma, mesenchymal
  - MeSH C04.557.450.795.315 – Desmoplastic Small Round Cell Tumor
  - MeSH C04.557.450.795.332 – Endometrial Stromal Tumors
    - MeSH C04.557.450.795.332.500 – Sarcoma, Endometrial Stromal
  - MeSH C04.557.450.795.350 – fibrosarcoma
    - MeSH C04.557.450.795.350.320 – dermatofibrosarcoma
    - MeSH C04.557.450.795.350.590 – neurofibrosarcoma
  - MeSH C04.557.450.795.390 – hemangiosarcoma
  - MeSH C04.557.450.795.400 – histiocytoma, malignant fibrous
  - MeSH C04.557.450.795.455 – leiomyosarcoma
  - MeSH C04.557.450.795.465 – liposarcoma
    - MeSH C04.557.450.795.465.425 – liposarcoma, myxoid
  - MeSH C04.557.450.795.480 – lymphangiosarcoma
  - MeSH C04.557.450.795.530 – mixed tumor, mesodermal
  - MeSH C04.557.450.795.550 – myosarcoma
    - MeSH C04.557.450.795.550.660 – rhabdomyosarcoma
      - MeSH C04.557.450.795.550.660.665 – rhabdomyosarcoma, alveolar
      - MeSH C04.557.450.795.550.660.675 – rhabdomyosarcoma, embryonal
  - MeSH C04.557.450.795.560 – myxosarcoma
  - MeSH C04.557.450.795.620 – osteosarcoma
    - MeSH C04.557.450.795.620.655 – osteosarcoma, juxtacortical
    - MeSH C04.557.450.795.620.800 – sarcoma, Ewing's
  - MeSH C04.557.450.795.650 – phyllodes tumor
  - MeSH C04.557.450.795.775 – sarcoma, alveolar soft part
  - MeSH C04.557.450.795.800 – sarcoma, clear cell
  - MeSH C04.557.450.795.830 – sarcoma, experimental
    - MeSH C04.557.450.795.830.760 – sarcoma 37
    - MeSH C04.557.450.795.830.780 – sarcoma 180
    - MeSH C04.557.450.795.830.800 – sarcoma, avian
    - MeSH C04.557.450.795.830.850 – sarcoma, yoshida
  - MeSH C04.557.450.795.850 – sarcoma, kaposi
  - MeSH C04.557.450.795.853 – Sarcoma, Myeloid
  - MeSH C04.557.450.795.870 – sarcoma, small cell
  - MeSH C04.557.450.795.875 – sarcoma, synovial

==== MeSH C04.557.465 – neoplasms, germ cell and embryonal ====
- MeSH C04.557.465.200 – carcinoma, embryonal
- MeSH C04.557.465.220 – chordoma
- MeSH C04.557.465.330 – germinoma
  - MeSH C04.557.465.330.300 – dysgerminoma
  - MeSH C04.557.465.330.800 – seminoma
- MeSH C04.557.465.420 – gonadoblastoma
- MeSH C04.557.465.510 – mesonephroma
  - MeSH C04.557.465.510.350 – endodermal sinus tumor
- MeSH C04.557.465.625 – neuroectodermal tumors
  - MeSH C04.557.465.625.200 – craniopharyngioma
  - MeSH C04.557.465.625.600 – neoplasms, neuroepithelial
    - MeSH C04.557.465.625.600.355 – ganglioneuroma
    - MeSH C04.557.465.625.600.380 – glioma
      - MeSH C04.557.465.625.600.380.080 – astrocytoma
        - MeSH C04.557.465.625.600.380.080.335 – glioblastoma
      - MeSH C04.557.465.625.600.380.185 – Diffuse Intrinsic Pontine Glioma
      - MeSH C04.557.465.625.600.380.290 – ependymoma
        - MeSH C04.557.465.625.600.380.290.390 – glioma, subependymal
      - MeSH C04.557.465.625.600.380.350 – ganglioglioma
      - MeSH C04.557.465.625.600.380.400 – gliosarcoma
      - MeSH C04.557.465.625.600.380.515 – medulloblastoma
      - MeSH C04.557.465.625.600.380.590 – oligodendroglioma
      - MeSH C04.557.465.625.600.380.795 – optic nerve glioma
    - MeSH C04.557.465.625.600.580 – neurocytoma
    - MeSH C04.557.465.625.600.590 – Neuroectodermal Tumors, Primitive
      - MeSH C04.557.465.625.600.590.500 – Medulloblastoma
      - MeSH C04.557.465.625.600.590.650 – Neuroectodermal Tumors, Primitive, Peripheral
        - MeSH C04.557.465.625.600.590.650.550 – Neuroblastoma
          - MeSH C04.557.465.625.600.590.650.550.150 – Esthesioneuroblastoma, Olfactory
          - MeSH C04.557.465.625.600.590.650.550.300 – Ganglioneuroblastoma
    - MeSH C04.557.465.625.600.657 – Pinealoma
    - MeSH C04.557.465.625.600.725 – Retinoblastoma
  - MeSH C04.557.465.625.630 – neuroectodermal tumor, melanotic
  - MeSH C04.557.465.625.650 – neuroendocrine tumors
    - MeSH C04.557.465.625.650.025 – adenoma, acidophil
    - MeSH C04.557.465.625.650.075 – adenoma, basophil
    - MeSH C04.557.465.625.650.095 – adenoma, chromophobe
    - MeSH C04.557.465.625.650.135 – apudoma
    - MeSH C04.557.465.625.650.200 – carcinoid tumor
      - MeSH C04.557.465.625.650.200.500 – malignant carcinoid syndrome
        - MeSH C04.557.465.625.650.200.500.205 – carcinoid heart disease
    - MeSH C04.557.465.625.650.240 – carcinoma, neuroendocrine
      - MeSH C04.557.465.625.650.240.315 – carcinoma, medullary
      - MeSH C04.557.465.625.650.240.325 – carcinoma, merkel cell
      - MeSH C04.557.465.625.650.240.695 – somatostatinoma
      - MeSH C04.557.465.625.650.240.847 – vipoma
    - MeSH C04.557.465.625.650.510 – melanoma
      - MeSH C04.557.465.625.650.510.385 – hutchinson's melanotic freckle
      - MeSH C04.557.465.625.650.510.515 – melanoma, amelanotic
      - MeSH C04.557.465.625.650.510.520 – Cutaneous Malignant Melanoma
        - MeSH C04.557.465.625.650.510.520.001 – Dysplastic Nevus Syndrome
      - MeSH C04.557.465.625.650.510.525 – melanoma, experimental
      - MeSH C04.557.465.625.650.510.762 – Uveal Melanoma
    - MeSH C04.557.465.625.650.595 – neurilemmoma
      - MeSH C04.557.465.625.650.595.610 – neuroma, acoustic
        - MeSH C04.557.465.625.650.595.610.500 – neurofibromatosis 2
    - MeSH C04.557.465.625.650.700 – paraganglioma
      - MeSH C04.557.465.625.650.700.705 – paraganglioma, extra-adrenal
        - MeSH C04.557.465.625.650.700.705.220 – carotid body tumor
        - MeSH C04.557.465.625.650.700.705.340 – glomus jugulare tumor
        - MeSH C04.557.465.625.650.700.705.360 – glomus tympanicum tumor
      - MeSH C04.557.465.625.650.700.725 – pheochromocytoma
- MeSH C04.557.465.900 – teratocarcinoma
- MeSH C04.557.465.910 – teratoma
  - MeSH C04.557.465.910.250 – Dermoid Cyst
  - MeSH C04.557.465.910.850 – struma ovarii
- MeSH C04.557.465.955 – trophoblastic neoplasms
  - MeSH C04.557.465.955.207 – choriocarcinoma
    - MeSH C04.557.465.955.207.438 – Choriocarcinoma, Non-gestational
    - MeSH C04.557.465.955.207.875 – Trophoblastic Tumor, Placental Site
  - MeSH C04.557.465.955.416 – Gestational Trophoblastic Disease
    - MeSH C04.557.465.955.416.812 – Hydatidiform Mole
      - MeSH C04.557.465.955.416.812.500 – Hydatidiform Mole, Invasive

==== MeSH C04.557.470 – neoplasms, glandular and epithelial ====
- MeSH C04.557.470.035 – adenoma
  - MeSH C04.557.470.035.012 – acth-secreting pituitary adenoma
  - MeSH C04.557.470.035.025 – adenoma, acidophil
  - MeSH C04.557.470.035.075 – adenoma, basophil
  - MeSH C04.557.470.035.085 – adenoma, bile duct
  - MeSH C04.557.470.035.095 – adenoma, chromophobe
  - MeSH C04.557.470.035.100 – adenoma, islet cell
    - MeSH C04.557.470.035.100.852 – insulinoma
  - MeSH C04.557.470.035.120 – adenoma, liver cell
  - MeSH C04.557.470.035.140 – adenoma, oxyphilic
  - MeSH C04.557.470.035.155 – adenoma, pleomorphic
  - MeSH C04.557.470.035.175 – adenoma, sweat gland
    - MeSH C04.557.470.035.175.125 – acrospiroma
    - MeSH C04.557.470.035.175.375 – hidrocystoma
    - MeSH C04.557.470.035.175.588 – Poroma
    - MeSH C04.557.470.035.175.800 – syringoma
    - MeSH C04.557.470.035.175.900 – Tubular Sweat Gland Adenomas
  - MeSH C04.557.470.035.185 – adenoma, villous
  - MeSH C04.557.470.035.200 – adenomatoid tumor
  - MeSH C04.557.470.035.210 – adenomatosis, pulmonary
  - MeSH C04.557.470.035.215 – adenomatous polyps
    - MeSH C04.557.470.035.215.100 – adenomatous polyposis coli
      - MeSH C04.557.470.035.215.100.500 – gardner syndrome
  - MeSH C04.557.470.035.232 – adrenal rest tumor
  - MeSH C04.557.470.035.250 – apudoma
  - MeSH C04.557.470.035.320 – cystadenoma
    - MeSH C04.557.470.035.320.225 – cystadenoma, mucinous
    - MeSH C04.557.470.035.320.230 – cystadenoma, papillary
    - MeSH C04.557.470.035.320.240 – cystadenoma, serous
  - MeSH C04.557.470.035.415 – growth hormone-secreting pituitary adenoma
  - MeSH C04.557.470.035.510 – mesothelioma
    - MeSH C04.557.470.035.510.515 – mesothelioma, cystic
    - MeSH C04.557.470.035.510.757 – Mesothelioma, Malignant
  - MeSH C04.557.470.035.625 – prolactinoma
- MeSH C04.557.470.200 – carcinoma
  - MeSH C04.557.470.200.025 – adenocarcinoma
    - MeSH C04.557.470.200.025.014 – Adenocarcinoma in Situ
    - MeSH C04.557.470.200.025.022 – Adenocarcinoma of Lung
      - MeSH C04.557.470.200.025.022.500 – Adenocarcinoma, Bronchiolo-Alveolar
    - MeSH C04.557.470.200.025.045 – adenocarcinoma, clear cell
    - MeSH C04.557.470.200.025.060 – adenocarcinoma, follicular
      - MeSH C04.557.470.200.025.060.225 – carcinoma, papillary, follicular
    - MeSH C04.557.470.200.025.075 – adenocarcinoma, mucinous
      - MeSH C04.557.470.200.025.075.500 – Pseudomyxoma Peritonei
    - MeSH C04.557.470.200.025.085 – adenocarcinoma, papillary
      - MeSH C04.557.470.200.025.085.225 – carcinoma, papillary, follicular
      - MeSH C04.557.470.200.025.085.612 – Thyroid Cancer, Papillary
    - MeSH C04.557.470.200.025.095 – adenocarcinoma, scirrhous
      - MeSH C04.557.470.200.025.095.410 – linitis plastica
    - MeSH C04.557.470.200.025.105 – adenocarcinoma, sebaceous
    - MeSH C04.557.470.200.025.152 – adrenocortical carcinoma
    - MeSH C04.557.470.200.025.200 – carcinoid tumor
      - MeSH C04.557.470.200.025.200.500 – malignant carcinoid syndrome
        - MeSH C04.557.470.200.025.200.500.205 – carcinoid heart disease
    - MeSH C04.557.470.200.025.220 – Carcinoma, Giant Cell
    - MeSH C04.557.470.200.025.232 – carcinoma, ductal
      - MeSH C04.557.470.200.025.232.500 – carcinoma, ductal, breast
      - MeSH C04.557.470.200.025.232.750 – carcinoma, pancreatic ductal
    - MeSH C04.557.470.200.025.240 – carcinoma, endometrioid
    - MeSH C04.557.470.200.025.255 – carcinoma, hepatocellular
    - MeSH C04.557.470.200.025.275 – carcinoma, intraductal, noninfiltrating
    - MeSH C04.557.470.200.025.290 – carcinoma, islet cell
      - MeSH C04.557.470.200.025.290.500 – gastrinoma
      - MeSH C04.557.470.200.025.290.750 – glucagonoma
    - MeSH C04.557.470.200.025.305 – carcinoma, lobular
    - MeSH C04.557.470.200.025.340 – carcinoma, mucoepidermoid
    - MeSH C04.557.470.200.025.370 – carcinoma, neuroendocrine
      - MeSH C04.557.470.200.025.370.315 – carcinoma, medullary
      - MeSH C04.557.470.200.025.370.325 – carcinoma, merkel cell
      - MeSH C04.557.470.200.025.370.695 – somatostatinoma
      - MeSH C04.557.470.200.025.370.847 – vipoma
    - MeSH C04.557.470.200.025.390 – carcinoma, renal cell
    - MeSH C04.557.470.200.025.415 – carcinoma, signet ring cell
      - MeSH C04.557.470.200.025.415.410 – krukenberg tumor
    - MeSH C04.557.470.200.025.420 – carcinoma, skin appendage
    - MeSH C04.557.470.200.025.450 – cholangiocarcinoma
      - MeSH C04.557.470.200.025.450.500 – Klatskin Tumor
    - MeSH C04.557.470.200.025.455 – choriocarcinoma
      - MeSH C04.557.470.200.025.455.750 – choriocarcinoma, non-gestational
      - MeSH C04.557.470.200.025.455.875 – trophoblastic tumor, placental site
    - MeSH C04.557.470.200.025.480 – cystadenocarcinoma
      - MeSH C04.557.470.200.025.480.225 – cystadenocarcinoma, mucinous
      - MeSH C04.557.470.200.025.480.230 – cystadenocarcinoma, papillary
      - MeSH C04.557.470.200.025.480.240 – cystadenocarcinoma, serous
    - MeSH C04.557.470.200.025.500 – Eccrine Porocarcinoma
    - MeSH C04.557.470.200.025.660 – paget's disease, extramammary
    - MeSH C04.557.470.200.025.715 – pulmonary adenomatosis, ovine
  - MeSH C04.557.470.200.150 – Carcinoma, Adenosquamous
  - MeSH C04.557.470.200.170 – Carcinoma, Basosquamous
  - MeSH C04.557.470.200.200 – Carcinoma, Ehrlich Tumor
  - MeSH C04.557.470.200.220 – carcinoma, giant cell
  - MeSH C04.557.470.200.240 – carcinoma in situ
    - MeSH C04.557.470.200.240.124 – Adenocarcinoma in Situ
    - MeSH C04.557.470.200.240.187 – Breast Carcinoma In Situ
      - MeSH C04.557.470.200.240.187.250 – Carcinoma, Intraductal, Noninfiltrating
      - MeSH C04.557.470.200.240.187.500 – Paget's Disease, Mammary
    - MeSH C04.557.470.200.240.500 – prostatic intraepithelial neoplasia
  - MeSH C04.557.470.200.255 – carcinoma, krebs 2
  - MeSH C04.557.470.200.260 – carcinoma, large cell
  - MeSH C04.557.470.200.280 – carcinoma, lewis lung
  - MeSH C04.557.470.200.295 – Carcinoma, Ovarian Epithelial
  - MeSH C04.557.470.200.360 – carcinoma, papillary
  - MeSH C04.557.470.200.400 – carcinoma, squamous cell
    - MeSH C04.557.470.200.400.330 – Esophageal Squamous Cell Carcinoma
    - MeSH C04.557.470.200.400.565 – Squamous Cell Carcinoma of Head and Neck
  - MeSH C04.557.470.200.430 – carcinoma, transitional cell
  - MeSH C04.557.470.200.450 – carcinoma, verrucous
    - MeSH C04.557.470.200.450.500 – Buschke-Lowenstein Tumor
  - MeSH C04.557.470.200.588 – Mammary Analogue Secretory Carcinoma
  - MeSH C04.557.470.200.623 – Nasopharyngeal Carcinoma
  - MeSH C04.557.470.200.649 – Non-Melanoma Skin Neoplasms
    - MeSH C04.557.470.200.649.001 – Cutaneous Squamous Cell Carcinoma
      - MeSH C04.557.470.200.649.001.001 – Bowen's Disease
    - MeSH C04.557.470.200.649.002 – Basal Cell Carcinoma
      - MeSH C04.557.470.200.649.002.001 – Basal Cell Nevus Syndrome
  - MeSH C04.557.470.200.674 – Non-Muscle Invasive Bladder Neoplasms
  - MeSH C04.557.470.200.725 – Thyroid Carcinoma, Anaplastic
- MeSH C04.557.470.550 – neoplasms, adnexal and skin appendage
  - MeSH C04.557.470.550.105 – adenocarcinoma, sebaceous
  - MeSH C04.557.470.550.175 – adenoma, sweat gland
    - MeSH C04.557.470.550.175.125 – acrospiroma
    - MeSH C04.557.470.550.175.375 – hidrocystoma
    - MeSH C04.557.470.550.175.588 – Poroma
    - MeSH C04.557.470.550.175.800 – syringoma
    - MeSH C04.557.470.550.175.900 – Tubular Sweat Gland Adenomas
  - MeSH C04.557.470.550.420 – carcinoma, skin appendage
- MeSH C04.557.470.565 – neoplasms, basal cell
  - MeSH C04.557.470.565.165 – carcinoma, basal cell
  - MeSH C04.557.470.565.170 – carcinoma, basosquamous
  - MeSH C04.557.470.565.625 – pilomatrixoma
- MeSH C04.557.470.590 – neoplasms, cystic, mucinous, and serous
  - MeSH C04.557.470.590.075 – adenocarcinoma, mucinous
    - MeSH C04.557.470.590.075.500 – Pseudomyxoma Peritonei
  - MeSH C04.557.470.590.340 – carcinoma, mucoepidermoid
  - MeSH C04.557.470.590.415 – carcinoma, signet ring cell
    - MeSH C04.557.470.590.415.410 – krukenberg tumor
  - MeSH C04.557.470.590.480 – cystadenocarcinoma
    - MeSH C04.557.470.590.480.225 – cystadenocarcinoma, mucinous
    - MeSH C04.557.470.590.480.230 – cystadenocarcinoma, papillary
    - MeSH C04.557.470.590.480.240 – cystadenocarcinoma, serous
  - MeSH C04.557.470.590.485 – cystadenoma
    - MeSH C04.557.470.590.485.225 – cystadenoma, mucinous
    - MeSH C04.557.470.590.485.230 – cystadenoma, papillary
    - MeSH C04.557.470.590.485.240 – cystadenoma, serous
  - MeSH C04.557.470.590.580 – mucoepidermoid tumor
- MeSH C04.557.470.615 – neoplasms, ductal, lobular, and medullary
  - MeSH C04.557.470.615.132 – carcinoma, ductal
    - MeSH C04.557.470.615.132.500 – carcinoma, ductal, breast
    - MeSH C04.557.470.615.132.750 – carcinoma, pancreatic ductal
  - MeSH C04.557.470.615.275 – carcinoma, intraductal, noninfiltrating
    - MeSH C04.557.470.615.275.625 – paget's disease, mammary
  - MeSH C04.557.470.615.305 – carcinoma, lobular
  - MeSH C04.557.470.615.315 – carcinoma, medullary
  - MeSH C04.557.470.615.660 – paget's disease, extramammary
  - MeSH C04.557.470.615.665 – Pancreatic Intraductal Neoplasms
  - MeSH C04.557.470.615.670 – papilloma, intraductal
- MeSH C04.557.470.625 – neoplasms, fibroepithelial
  - MeSH C04.557.470.625.050 – adenofibroma
    - MeSH C04.557.470.625.050.500 – Cystadenofibroma
  - MeSH C04.557.470.625.150 – brenner tumor
  - MeSH C04.557.470.625.350 – fibroadenoma
- MeSH C04.557.470.660 – neoplasms, mesothelial
  - MeSH C04.557.470.660.200 – adenomatoid tumor
  - MeSH C04.557.470.660.510 – mesothelioma
    - MeSH C04.557.470.660.510.515 – mesothelioma, cystic
    - MeSH C04.557.470.660.510.757 – Mesothelioma, Malignant
- MeSH C04.557.470.670 – neoplasms, neuroepithelial
  - MeSH C04.557.470.670.355 – ganglioneuroma
  - MeSH C04.557.470.670.380 – glioma
    - MeSH C04.557.470.670.380.080 – astrocytoma
      - MeSH C04.557.470.670.380.080.335 – glioblastoma
    - MeSH C04.557.470.670.380.185 – Diffuse Intrinsic Pontine Glioma
    - MeSH C04.557.470.670.380.290 – ependymoma
      - MeSH C04.557.470.670.380.290.390 – glioma, subependymal
    - MeSH C04.557.470.670.380.350 – ganglioglioma
    - MeSH C04.557.470.670.380.400 – gliosarcoma
    - MeSH C04.557.470.670.380.515 – medulloblastoma
    - MeSH C04.557.470.670.380.590 – oligodendroglioma
    - MeSH C04.557.470.670.380.795 – optic nerve glioma
  - MeSH C04.557.470.670.580 – neurocytoma
  - MeSH C04.557.470.670.590 – neuroectodermal tumors, primitive
    - MeSH C04.557.470.670.590.500 – medulloblastoma
    - MeSH C04.557.470.670.590.650 – neuroectodermal tumors, primitive, peripheral
      - MeSH C04.557.470.670.590.650.550 – neuroblastoma
        - MeSH C04.557.470.670.590.650.550.150 – esthesioneuroblastoma, olfactory
        - MeSH C04.557.470.670.590.650.550.300 – ganglioneuroblastoma
  - MeSH C04.557.470.670.657 – pinealoma
  - MeSH C04.557.470.670.725 – retinoblastoma
- MeSH C04.557.470.700 – neoplasms, squamous cell
  - MeSH C04.557.470.700.040 – acanthoma
  - MeSH C04.557.470.700.360 – carcinoma, papillary
  - MeSH C04.557.470.700.400 – carcinoma, squamous cell
    - MeSH C04.557.470.700.400.565 – Esophageal Squamous Cell Carcinoma
  - MeSH C04.557.470.700.450 – carcinoma, verrucous
    - MeSH C04.557.470.700.450.500 – Buschke-Lowenstein Tumor
  - MeSH C04.557.470.700.600 – papilloma
    - MeSH C04.557.470.700.600.610 – papilloma, inverted

==== MeSH C04.557.475 – neoplasms, gonadal tissue ====
- MeSH C04.557.475.395 – gonadoblastoma
- MeSH C04.557.475.750 – sex cord-gonadal stromal tumors
  - MeSH C04.557.475.750.656 – granulosa cell tumor
  - MeSH C04.557.475.750.751 – luteoma
  - MeSH C04.557.475.750.847 – sertoli-leydig cell tumor
    - MeSH C04.557.475.750.847.249 – leydig cell tumor
    - MeSH C04.557.475.750.847.500 – sertoli cell tumor
  - MeSH C04.557.475.750.875 – thecoma

==== MeSH C04.557.580 – neoplasms, nerve tissue ====
- MeSH C04.557.580.520 – meningioma
- MeSH C04.557.580.600 – nerve sheath neoplasms
  - MeSH C04.557.580.600.580 – neurofibroma
    - MeSH C04.557.580.600.580.585 – neurofibroma, plexiform
    - MeSH C04.557.580.600.580.590 – neurofibromatosis
      - MeSH C04.557.580.600.580.590.650 – neurofibromatosis 1
      - MeSH C04.557.580.600.580.590.655 – neurofibromatosis 2
  - (* MeSH C04.557.580.600.580.590.655 – neurofibromatosis 2
    - MeSH C04.557.580.600.580.795 – neurofibrosarcoma
  - MeSH C04.557.580.600.610 – neuroma
    - MeSH C04.557.580.600.610.595 – neurilemmoma
      - MeSH C04.557.580.600.610.595.610 – neuroma, acoustic
        - MeSH C04.557.580.600.610.595.610.500 – neurofibromatosis 2
  - MeSH C04.557.580.600.625 – neurothekeoma
- MeSH C04.557.580.625 – neuroectodermal tumors
  - MeSH C04.557.580.625.200 – craniopharyngioma
  - MeSH C04.557.580.625.600 – neoplasms, neuroepithelial
    - MeSH C04.557.580.625.600.355 – ganglioneuroma
    - MeSH C04.557.580.625.600.380 – glioma
      - MeSH C04.557.580.625.600.380.080 – astrocytoma
        - MeSH C04.557.580.625.600.380.080.335 – glioblastoma
      - MeSH C04.557.580.625.600.380.185 – Diffuse Intrinsic Pontine Glioma
      - MeSH C04.557.580.625.600.380.290 – ependymoma
        - MeSH C04.557.580.625.600.380.290.390 – glioma, subependymal
      - MeSH C04.557.580.625.600.380.350 – ganglioglioma
      - MeSH C04.557.580.625.600.380.400 – gliosarcoma
      - MeSH C04.557.580.625.600.380.515 – medulloblastoma
      - MeSH C04.557.580.625.600.380.590 – oligodendroglioma
      - MeSH C04.557.580.625.600.380.795 – optic nerve glioma
    - MeSH C04.557.580.625.600.580 – neurocytoma
    - MeSH C04.557.580.625.600.590 – neuroectodermal tumors, primitive
      - MeSH C04.557.580.625.600.590.500 – medulloblastoma
      - MeSH C04.557.580.625.600.590.650 – neuroectodermal tumors, primitive, peripheral
        - MeSH C04.557.580.625.600.590.650.550 – neuroblastoma
          - MeSH C04.557.580.625.600.590.650.550.150 – esthesioneuroblastoma, olfactory
          - MeSH C04.557.580.625.600.590.650.550.300 – ganglioneuroblastoma
    - MeSH C04.557.580.625.600.657 – pinealoma
    - MeSH C04.557.580.625.600.725 – retinoblastoma
  - MeSH C04.557.580.625.630 – neuroectodermal tumor, melanotic
  - MeSH C04.557.580.625.650 – neuroendocrine tumors
    - MeSH C04.557.580.625.650.025 – adenoma, acidophil
    - MeSH C04.557.580.625.650.075 – adenoma, basophil
    - MeSH C04.557.580.625.650.095 – adenoma, chromophobe
    - MeSH C04.557.580.625.650.135 – apudoma
    - MeSH C04.557.580.625.650.200 – carcinoid tumor
      - MeSH C04.557.580.625.650.200.500 – malignant carcinoid syndrome
        - MeSH C04.557.580.625.650.200.500.205 – carcinoid heart disease
    - MeSH C04.557.580.625.650.240 – carcinoma, neuroendocrine
      - MeSH C04.557.580.625.650.240.315 – carcinoma, medullary
      - MeSH C04.557.580.625.650.240.325 – carcinoma, merkel cell
    - MeSH C04.557.580.625.650.510 – melanoma
      - MeSH C04.557.580.625.650.510.385 – hutchinson's melanotic freckle
      - MeSH C04.557.580.625.650.510.515 – melanoma, amelanotic
      - MeSH C04.557.580.625.650.510.520 – Cutaneous Malignant Melanoma
      - MeSH C04.557.580.625.650.510.525 – melanoma, experimental
      - MeSH C04.557.580.625.650.510.762 – Uveal Melanoma
    - MeSH C04.557.580.625.650.595 – neurilemmoma
      - MeSH C04.557.580.625.650.595.610 – neuroma, acoustic
    - MeSH C04.557.580.625.650.700 – paraganglioma
      - MeSH C04.557.580.625.650.700.705 – paraganglioma, extra-adrenal
        - MeSH C04.557.580.625.650.700.705.220 – carotid body tumor
        - MeSH C04.557.580.625.650.700.705.340 – glomus jugulare tumor
        - MeSH C04.557.580.625.650.700.705.360 – glomus tympanicum tumor
      - MeSH C04.557.580.625.650.700.725 – pheochromocytoma

==== MeSH C04.557.595 – neoplasms, plasma cell ====
- MeSH C04.557.595.250 – Immunoglobulin Light-chain Amyloidosis
- MeSH C04.557.595.500 – Multiple Myeloma
  - MeSH C04.557.595.500.500 – Leukemia, Plasma Cell
- MeSH C04.557.595.600 – Plasmacytoma
- MeSH C04.557.595.925 – Waldenstrom Macroglobulinemia

==== MeSH C04.557.645 – neoplasms, vascular tissue ====
- MeSH C04.557.645.100 – angiofibroma
- MeSH C04.557.645.115 – angiokeratoma
- MeSH C04.557.645.350 – glomus tumor
- MeSH C04.557.645.375 – hemangioma
  - MeSH C04.557.645.375.185 – central nervous system venous angioma
  - MeSH C04.557.645.375.370 – hemangioendothelioma
    - MeSH C04.557.645.375.370.380 – hemangioendothelioma, epithelioid
  - MeSH C04.557.645.375.380 – hemangioma, capillary
    - MeSH C04.557.645.375.380.370 – hemangioblastoma
  - MeSH C04.557.645.375.385 – hemangioma, cavernous
    - MeSH C04.557.645.375.385.500 – hemangioma, cavernous, central nervous system
  - MeSH C04.557.645.375.617 – Kasabach-Merritt Syndrome
  - MeSH C04.557.645.375.850 – sturge-weber syndrome
- MeSH C04.557.645.380 – hemangiopericytoma
  - MeSH C04.557.645.380.500 – Myopericytoma
- MeSH C04.557.645.390 – hemangiosarcoma
- MeSH C04.557.645.520 – meningioma
- MeSH C04.557.645.750 – sarcoma, kaposi

==== MeSH C04.557.665 – nevi and melanomas ====
- MeSH C04.557.665.510 – melanoma
  - MeSH C04.557.665.510.385 – hutchinson's melanotic freckle
  - MeSH C04.557.665.510.515 – melanoma, amelanotic
  - MeSH C04.557.665.510.520 – Cutaneous Malignant Melanoma
  - MeSH C04.557.665.510.525 – melanoma, experimental
  - MeSH C04.557.665.510.762 – Uveal Melanoma
- MeSH C04.557.665.560 – nevus
  - MeSH C04.557.665.560.260 – dysplastic nevus syndrome
  - MeSH C04.557.665.560.580 – Nevus, Halol
  - MeSH C04.557.665.560.590 – nevus, intradermal
  - MeSH C04.557.665.560.615 – nevus, pigmented
    - MeSH C04.557.665.560.615.530 – mongolian spot
    - MeSH C04.557.665.560.615.550 – nevus, blue
    - MeSH C04.557.665.560.615.585 – nevus of ota
    - MeSH C04.557.665.560.615.625 – nevus, spindle cell
      - MeSH C04.557.665.560.615.625.585 – nevus, epithelioid and spindle cell
  - MeSH C04.557.665.560.700 – Nevus, Sebaceous of Jadassohn

==== MeSH C04.557.695 – odontogenic tumors ====
- MeSH C04.557.695.065 – ameloblastoma
- MeSH C04.557.695.210 – cementoma
- MeSH C04.557.695.605 – odontogenic cyst, calcifying
- MeSH C04.557.695.607 – odontogenic tumor, squamous
- MeSH C04.557.695.610 – odontoma

=== MeSH C04.588 – neoplasms by site ===
==== MeSH C04.588.033 – abdominal neoplasms ====
- MeSH C04.588.033.513 – peritoneal neoplasms
- MeSH C04.588.033.731 – retroperitoneal neoplasms
- MeSH C04.588.033.740 – Sister Mary Joseph's Nodule

==== MeSH C04.588.149 – bone neoplasms ====
- MeSH C04.588.149.030 – adamantinoma
- MeSH C04.588.149.276 – femoral neoplasms
- MeSH C04.588.149.721 – skull neoplasms
  - MeSH C04.588.149.721.450 – jaw neoplasms
    - MeSH C04.588.149.721.450.583 – mandibular neoplasms
    - MeSH C04.588.149.721.450.601 – maxillary neoplasms
    - MeSH C04.588.149.721.450.692 – palatal neoplasms
  - MeSH C04.588.149.721.600 – nose neoplasms
  - MeSH C04.588.149.721.656 – orbital neoplasms
  - MeSH C04.588.149.721.828 – skull base neoplasms
- MeSH C04.588.149.828 – spinal neoplasms

==== MeSH C04.588.180 – breast neoplasms ====
- MeSH C04.588.180.130 – Breast Carcinoma In Situ
- MeSH C04.588.180.260 – breast neoplasms, male
- MeSH C04.588.180.390 – carcinoma, ductal, breast
- MeSH C04.588.180.437 – Carcinoma, Lobular
- MeSH C04.588.180.483 – Hereditary Breast and Ovarian Cancer Syndrome
- MeSH C04.588.180.576 – Inflammatory Breast Neoplasms
- MeSH C04.588.180.788 – Triple Negative Breast Neoplasms
- MeSH C04.588.180.800 – Unilateral Breast Neoplasms

==== MeSH C04.588.274 – digestive system neoplasms ====
- MeSH C04.588.274.120 – biliary tract neoplasms
  - MeSH C04.588.274.120.250 – bile duct neoplasms
    - MeSH C04.588.274.120.250.250 – common bile duct neoplasms
  - MeSH C04.588.274.120.401 – gallbladder neoplasms
- MeSH C04.588.274.476 – gastrointestinal neoplasms
  - MeSH C04.588.274.476.205 – esophageal neoplasms
    - MeSH C04.588.274.476.205.500 – Esophageal Squamous Cell Carcinoma
  - MeSH C04.588.274.476.411 – intestinal neoplasms
    - MeSH C04.588.274.476.411.184 – cecal neoplasms
      - MeSH C04.588.274.476.411.184.290 – appendiceal neoplasms
    - MeSH C04.588.274.476.411.307 – colorectal neoplasms
      - MeSH C04.588.274.476.411.307.089 – adenomatous polyposis coli
        - MeSH C04.588.274.476.411.307.089.393 – gardner syndrome
      - MeSH C04.588.274.476.411.307.180 – colonic neoplasms
        - MeSH C04.588.274.476.411.307.180.400 – Colitis-Associated Neoplasms
        - MeSH C04.588.274.476.411.307.180.800 – sigmoid neoplasms
      - MeSH C04.588.274.476.411.307.190 – colorectal neoplasms, hereditary nonpolyposis
      - MeSH C04.588.274.476.411.307.790 – rectal neoplasms
        - MeSH C04.588.274.476.411.307.790.040 – anus neoplasms
          - MeSH C04.588.274.476.411.307.790.040.040 – anal gland neoplasms
    - MeSH C04.588.274.476.411.445 – duodenal neoplasms
    - MeSH C04.588.274.476.411.501 – ileal neoplasms
    - MeSH C04.588.274.476.411.523 – jejunal neoplasms
  - MeSH C04.588.274.476.767 – stomach neoplasms
- MeSH C04.588.274.623 – liver neoplasms
  - MeSH C04.588.274.623.040 – adenoma, liver cell
  - MeSH C04.588.274.623.160 – carcinoma, hepatocellular
  - MeSH C04.588.274.623.460 – liver neoplasms, experimental
- MeSH C04.588.274.761 – pancreatic neoplasms
  - MeSH C04.588.274.761.249 – adenoma, islet cell
    - MeSH C04.588.274.761.249.500 – insulinoma
  - MeSH C04.588.274.761.500 – carcinoma, islet cell
    - MeSH C04.588.274.761.500.124 – gastrinoma
    - MeSH C04.588.274.761.500.249 – glucagonoma
    - MeSH C04.588.274.761.500.500 – somatostatinoma
    - MeSH C04.588.274.761.500.750 – vipoma
  - MeSH C04.588.274.761.750 – carcinoma, pancreatic ductal
  - MeSH C04.588.274.761.875 – Pancreatic Intraductal Neoplasms
- MeSH C04.588.274.780 – peritoneal neoplasms

==== MeSH C04.588.322 – endocrine gland neoplasms ====
- MeSH C04.588.322.078 – adrenal gland neoplasms
  - MeSH C04.588.322.078.265 – adrenal cortex neoplasms
    - MeSH C04.588.322.078.265.500 – adrenocortical adenoma
    - MeSH C04.588.322.078.265.750 – adrenocortical carcinoma
- MeSH C04.588.322.400 – multiple endocrine neoplasia
  - MeSH C04.588.322.400.500 – multiple endocrine neoplasia type 1
  - MeSH C04.588.322.400.505 – multiple endocrine neoplasia type 2a
  - MeSH C04.588.322.400.510 – multiple endocrine neoplasia type 2b
- MeSH C04.588.322.455 – ovarian neoplasms
  - MeSH C04.588.322.455.199 – Carcinoma, Ovarian Epithelial
  - MeSH C04.588.322.455.398 – granulosa cell tumor
  - MeSH C04.588.322.455.431 – Hereditary Breast and Ovarian Cancer Syndrome
  - MeSH C04.588.322.455.464 – luteoma
  - MeSH C04.588.322.455.531 – meigs syndrome
  - MeSH C04.588.322.455.648 – sertoli-leydig cell tumor
  - MeSH C04.588.322.455.765 – thecoma
- MeSH C04.588.322.475 – pancreatic neoplasms
  - MeSH C04.588.322.475.249 – adenoma, islet cell
    - MeSH C04.588.322.475.249.500 – insulinoma
  - MeSH C04.588.322.475.500 – carcinoma, islet cell
    - MeSH C04.588.322.475.500.124 – gastrinoma
    - MeSH C04.588.322.475.500.249 – glucagonoma
    - MeSH C04.588.322.475.500.500 – somatostatinoma
    - MeSH C04.588.322.475.500.750 – vipoma
  - MeSH C04.588.322.475.750 – carcinoma, pancreatic ductal
- MeSH C04.588.322.490 – paraneoplastic endocrine syndromes
- MeSH C04.588.322.525 – parathyroid neoplasms
- MeSH C04.588.322.609 – pituitary neoplasms
  - MeSH C04.588.322.609.145 – acth-secreting pituitary adenoma
    - MeSH C04.588.322.609.145.500 – nelson syndrome
  - MeSH C04.588.322.609.292 – growth hormone-secreting pituitary adenoma
  - MeSH C04.588.322.609.792 – prolactinoma
- MeSH C04.588.322.762 – testicular neoplasms
  - MeSH C04.588.322.762.500 – sertoli-leydig cell tumor
    - MeSH C04.588.322.762.500.249 – Leydig Cell Tumor
    - MeSH C04.588.322.762.500.500 – Sertoli Cell Tumor
- MeSH C04.588.322.894 – thyroid neoplasms
  - MeSH C04.588.322.894.400 – Thyroid Cancer, Papillary
  - MeSH C04.588.322.894.800 – thyroid nodule

==== MeSH C04.588.364 – eye neoplasms ====
- MeSH C04.588.364.235 – conjunctival neoplasms
- MeSH C04.588.364.447 – Intraocular Lymphoma
- MeSH C04.588.364.659 – orbital neoplasms
- MeSH C04.588.364.659 – orbital neoplasms
- MeSH C04.588.364.738 – Paraneoplastic Syndromes, Ocular
- MeSH C04.588.364.818 – Retinal Neoplasms
  - MeSH C04.588.364.818.760 – retinoblastoma
- MeSH C04.588.364.978 – uveal neoplasms
  - MeSH C04.588.364.978.223 – choroid neoplasms
  - MeSH C04.588.364.978.312 – Uveal Melanoma
  - MeSH C04.588.364.978.400 – iris neoplasms

==== MeSH C04.588.443 – head and neck neoplasms ====
- MeSH C04.588.443.177 – Squamous Cell Carcinoma of Head and Neck
- MeSH C04.588.443.353 – esophageal neoplasms
  - MeSH C04.588.443.353.500 – Esophageal Squamous Cell Carcinoma
- MeSH C04.588.443.392 – facial neoplasms
  - MeSH C04.588.443.392.500 – eyelid neoplasms
- MeSH C04.588.443.591 – mouth neoplasms
  - MeSH C04.588.443.591.402 – gingival neoplasms
  - MeSH C04.588.443.591.545 – leukoplakia, oral
    - MeSH C04.588.443.591.545.500 – leukoplakia, hairy
  - MeSH C04.588.443.591.550 – lip neoplasms
  - MeSH C04.588.443.591.692 – palatal neoplasms
  - MeSH C04.588.443.591.824 – salivary gland neoplasms
    - MeSH C04.588.443.591.824.695 – parotid neoplasms
    - MeSH C04.588.443.591.824.882 – sublingual gland neoplasms
    - MeSH C04.588.443.591.824.885 – submandibular gland neoplasms
  - MeSH C04.588.443.591.925 – tongue neoplasms
- MeSH C04.588.443.665 – otorhinolaryngologic neoplasms
  - MeSH C04.588.443.665.312 – ear neoplasms
  - MeSH C04.588.443.665.481 – laryngeal neoplasms
  - MeSH C04.588.443.665.650 – nose neoplasms
    - MeSH C04.588.443.665.650.693 – paranasal sinus neoplasms
      - MeSH C04.588.443.665.650.693.575 – maxillary sinus neoplasms
  - MeSH C04.588.443.665.710 – pharyngeal neoplasms
    - MeSH C04.588.443.665.710.485 – hypopharyngeal neoplasms
    - MeSH C04.588.443.665.710.650 – nasopharyngeal neoplasms
      - MeSH C04.588.443.665.710.650.500 – Nasopharyngeal Carcinoma
    - MeSH C04.588.443.665.710.684 – oropharyngeal neoplasms
      - MeSH C04.588.443.665.710.684.800 – tonsillar neoplasms
- MeSH C04.588.443.680 – parathyroid neoplasms
- MeSH C04.588.443.915 – thyroid neoplasms
  - MeSH C04.588.443.915.400 – Thyroid Cancer, Papillary
  - MeSH C04.588.443.915.800 – thyroid nodule
- MeSH C04.588.443.925 – tracheal neoplasms

==== MeSH C04.588.448 – hematologic neoplasms ====
- MeSH C04.588.448.001 – Blastic Plasmacytoid Dendritic Cell Neoplasm
- MeSH C04.588.448.200 – bone marrow neoplasms
  - MeSH C04.588.448.200.500 – Polycythemia Vera

==== MeSH C04.588.531 – mammary neoplasms, animal ====
- MeSH C04.588.531.500 – mammary neoplasms, experimental

==== MeSH C04.588.614 – nervous system neoplasms ====
- MeSH C04.588.614.250 – central nervous system neoplasms
  - MeSH C04.588.614.250.195 – brain neoplasms
    - MeSH C04.588.614.250.195.205 – cerebral ventricle neoplasms
      - MeSH C04.588.614.250.195.205.200 – choroid plexus neoplasms
        - MeSH C04.588.614.250.195.205.200.500 – papilloma, choroid plexus
    - MeSH C04.588.614.250.195.411 – infratentorial neoplasms
      - MeSH C04.588.614.250.195.411.100 – brain stem neoplasms
        - MeSH C04.588.614.250.195.411.100.500 – Diffuse Intrinsic Pontine Glioma
      - MeSH C04.588.614.250.195.411.211 – cerebellar neoplasms
    - MeSH C04.588.614.250.195.648 – neurocytoma
    - MeSH C04.588.614.250.195.766 – pinealoma
    - MeSH C04.588.614.250.195.885 – supratentorial neoplasms
      - MeSH C04.588.614.250.195.885.500 – hypothalamic neoplasms
        - MeSH C04.588.614.250.195.885.500.299 – Pallister-Hall Syndrome
        - MeSH C04.588.614.250.195.885.500.600 – pituitary neoplasms
  - MeSH C04.588.614.250.387 – central nervous system cysts
    - MeSH C04.588.614.250.387.100 – arachnoid cyst
    - MeSH C04.588.614.250.387.200 – Colloid cyst
  - MeSH C04.588.614.250.580 – meningeal neoplasms
    - MeSH C04.588.614.250.580.150 – Meningeal Carcinomatosis
    - MeSH C04.588.614.250.580.500 – meningioma
  - MeSH C04.588.614.250.803 – spinal cord neoplasms
    - MeSH C04.588.614.250.803.342 – epidural neoplasms
- MeSH C04.588.614.300 – cranial nerve neoplasms
  - MeSH C04.588.614.300.015 – Neuroma, Acoustic
  - MeSH C04.588.614.300.600 – Optic Nerve Neoplasms
    - MeSH C04.588.614.300.600.600 – optic nerve glioma
- MeSH C04.588.614.550 – paraneoplastic syndromes, nervous system
  - MeSH C04.588.614.550.112 – Anti-N-Methyl-D-Aspartate Receptor Encephalitis
  - MeSH C04.588.614.550.450 – limbic encephalitis
  - MeSH C04.588.614.550.500 – Myasthenia Gravis
    - MeSH C04.588.614.550.500.225 – Lambert-Eaton Myasthenic Syndrome
  - MeSH C04.588.614.550.550 – myelitis, transverse
  - MeSH C04.588.614.550.600 – Opsoclonus-Myoclonus Syndrome
  - MeSH C04.588.614.550.650 – paraneoplastic cerebellar degeneration
  - MeSH C04.588.614.550.700 – paraneoplastic polyneuropathy
- MeSH C04.588.614.596 – peripheral nervous system neoplasms
  - MeSH C04.588.614.596.240 – cranial nerve neoplasms
    - MeSH C04.588.614.596.240.015 – neuroma, acoustic
    - MeSH C04.588.614.596.240.240 – optic nerve neoplasms
      - MeSH C04.588.614.596.240.240.500 – optic nerve glioma

==== MeSH C04.588.805 – skin neoplasms ====
- MeSH C04.588.805.040 – acanthoma
- MeSH C04.588.805.175 – Blastic Plasmacytoid Dendritic Cell Neoplasm
- MeSH C04.588.805.309 – Mastocytosis, Cutaneous
  - MeSH C04.588.805.309.500 – Mastocytoma, Skin
  - MeSH C04.588.805.309.850 – Urticaria Pigmentosa
- MeSH C04.588.805.377 – Melanoma
- MeSH C04.588.805.444 – Cutaneous Malignant Melanoma
- MeSH C04.588.805.511 – Non-Melanoma Skin Neoplasms
  - MeSH C04.588.805.511.001 – Cutaneous Squamous Cell Carcinoma
    - MeSH C04.588.805.511.001.001 – Bowen's Disease
  - MeSH C04.588.805.511.002 – Basal Cell Carcinoma
    - MeSH C04.588.805.511.002.001 – Basal Cell Nevus Syndrome
- MeSH C04.588.805.578 – sebaceous gland neoplasms
  - MeSH C04.588.805.578.500 – Muir-Torre Syndrome
- MeSH C04.588.805.776 – sweat gland neoplasms

==== MeSH C04.588.839 – soft tissue neoplasms ====
- MeSH C04.588.839.500 – muscle neoplasms
- MeSH C04.588.839.750 – vascular neoplasms

==== MeSH C04.588.894 – thoracic neoplasms ====
- MeSH C04.588.894.309 – heart neoplasms
  - MeSH C04.588.894.309.250 – Cardiac Papillary Fibroelastoma
  - MeSH C04.588.894.309.500 – Carney Complex
- MeSH C04.588.894.479 – mediastinal neoplasms
- MeSH C04.588.894.797 – respiratory tract neoplasms
  - MeSH C04.588.894.797.520 – lung neoplasms
    - MeSH C04.588.894.797.520.055 – Adenocarcinoma of Lung
      - MeSH C04.588.894.797.520.055.500 – Adenocarcinoma, Bronchiolo-Alveolar
    - MeSH C04.588.894.797.520.109 – Bronchial Neoplasms
      - MeSH C04.588.894.797.520.109.220 – Carcinoma, Bronchogenic
        - MeSH C04.588.894.797.520.109.220.249 – Carcinoma, Non-Small-Cell Lung
        - MeSH C04.588.894.797.520.109.220.624 – Small Cell Lung Carcinoma
    - MeSH C04.588.894.797.520.173 – Mesothelioma, Malignant
    - MeSH C04.588.894.797.520.237 – Multiple Pulmonary Nodules
    - MeSH C04.588.894.797.520.734 – pancoast's syndrome
    - MeSH C04.588.894.797.520.867 – pulmonary blastoma
    - MeSH C04.588.894.797.520.933 – pulmonary sclerosing hemangioma
  - MeSH C04.588.894.797.640 – pleural neoplasms
    - MeSH C04.588.894.797.640.350 – Mesothelioma, Malignant
    - MeSH C04.588.894.797.640.700 – pleural effusion, malignant
    - MeSH C04.588.894.797.640.800 – Solitary Fibrous Tumor, Pleural
  - MeSH C04.588.894.797.760 – tracheal neoplasms
- MeSH C04.588.894.949 – thymus neoplasms
  - MeSH C04.588.894.949.500 – thymoma

==== MeSH C04.588.945 – urogenital neoplasms ====
- MeSH C04.588.945.418 – genital neoplasms, female
  - MeSH C04.588.945.418.365 – fallopian tube neoplasms
  - MeSH C04.588.945.418.948 – uterine neoplasms
    - MeSH C04.588.945.418.948.585 – endometrial neoplasms
      - MeSH C04.588.945.418.948.585.124 – carcinoma, endometrioid
    - MeSH C04.588.945.418.948.850 – uterine cervical neoplasms
  - MeSH C04.588.945.418.955 – vaginal neoplasms
  - MeSH C04.588.945.418.968 – vulvar neoplasms
- MeSH C04.588.945.440 – genital neoplasms, male
  - MeSH C04.588.945.440.715 – penile neoplasms
  - MeSH C04.588.945.440.770 – prostatic neoplasms
    - MeSH C04.588.945.440.770.500 – Prostatic Neoplasms, Castration-Resistant
  - MeSH C04.588.945.440.915 – testicular neoplasms
    - MeSH C04.588.945.440.915.500 – Sertoli-Leydig Cell Tumor
      - MeSH C04.588.945.440.915.500.249 – Leydig Cell Tumor
      - MeSH C04.588.945.440.915.500.500 – Sertoli Cell Tumor
- MeSH C04.588.945.947 – urologic neoplasms
  - MeSH C04.588.945.947.535 – kidney neoplasms
    - MeSH C04.588.945.947.535.160 – carcinoma, renal cell
    - MeSH C04.588.945.947.535.585 – wilms tumor
      - MeSH C04.588.945.947.535.585.220 – denys-drash syndrome
      - MeSH C04.588.945.947.535.585.950 – wagr syndrome
    - MeSH C04.588.945.947.535.790 – nephroma, mesoblastic
  - MeSH C04.588.945.947.940 – ureteral neoplasms
  - MeSH C04.588.945.947.945 – urethral neoplasms
  - MeSH C04.588.945.947.960 – Urinary Bladder Neoplasms
    - MeSH C04.588.945.947.960.500 – Non-Muscle Invasive Bladder Neoplasms
- MeSH C04.588.945.956 – venereal tumors, veterinary

=== MeSH C04.619 – neoplasms, experimental ===
==== MeSH C04.619.531 – leukemia, experimental ====
- MeSH C04.619.531.216 – avian leukosis
- MeSH C04.619.531.594 – leukemia L1210
- MeSH C04.619.531.602 – leukemia L5178
- MeSH C04.619.531.782 – leukemia p388

==== MeSH C04.619.857 – sarcoma, experimental ====
- MeSH C04.619.857.573 – sarcoma 37
- MeSH C04.619.857.656 – sarcoma 180
- MeSH C04.619.857.800 – sarcoma, avian
- MeSH C04.619.857.822 – sarcoma, yoshida

=== MeSH C04.651 – neoplasms, multiple primary ===
==== MeSH C04.651.435 – hamartoma syndrome, multiple ====
- MeSH C04.651.435.500 – Proteus Syndrome

==== MeSH C04.651.600 – multiple endocrine neoplasia ====
- MeSH C04.651.600.500 – multiple endocrine neoplasia type 1
- MeSH C04.651.600.505 – multiple endocrine neoplasia type 2a
- MeSH C04.651.600.510 – multiple endocrine neoplasia type 2b

=== MeSH C04.697 – neoplastic processes ===
==== MeSH C04.697.098 – carcinogenesis ====
- MeSH C04.697.098.500 – Cell Transformation, Neoplastic
  - MeSH C04.697.098.500.110 – Blast Crisis
  - MeSH C04.697.098.500.160 – Cell Transformation, Viral
  - MeSH C04.697.098.500.580 – Warburg Effect, Oncologic
- MeSH C04.697.098.875 – Cocarcinogenesis

==== MeSH C04.697.645 – neoplasm invasiveness ====
- MeSH C04.697.645.500 – leukemic infiltration

==== MeSH C04.697.650 – neoplasm metastasis ====
- MeSH C04.697.650.280 – Extranodal Extension
- MeSH C04.697.650.560 – lymphatic metastasis
- MeSH C04.697.650.695 – Neoplasm Micrometastasis
- MeSH C04.697.650.830 – neoplasm seeding
- MeSH C04.697.650.895 – neoplasms, unknown primary
- MeSH C04.697.650.900 – Neoplastic Cells, Circulating

=== MeSH C04.700 – neoplastic syndromes, hereditary ===
==== MeSH C04.700.100 – adenomatous polyposis coli ====
- MeSH C04.700.100.392 – gardner syndrome

==== MeSH C04.700.250 – colorectal neoplasms, hereditary nonpolyposis ====
- MeSH C04.700.250.500 – Lynch Syndrome II
  - MeSH C04.700.250.500.500 – Muir-Torre Syndrome

==== MeSH C04.700.630 – multiple endocrine neoplasia ====
- MeSH C04.700.630.500 – multiple endocrine neoplasia type 1
- MeSH C04.700.630.505 – multiple endocrine neoplasia type 2a
- MeSH C04.700.630.510 – multiple endocrine neoplasia type 2b

==== MeSH C04.700.631 – neurofibromatosis ====
- MeSH C04.700.645.650 – neurofibromatosis 1
- MeSH C04.700.645.655 – neurofibromatosis 2

==== MeSH C04.700.900 – wilms tumor ====
- MeSH C04.700.635.220 – denys-drash syndrome
- MeSH C04.700.635.950 – wagr syndrome

=== MeSH C04.730 – paraneoplastic syndromes ===
==== MeSH C04.730.713 – paraneoplastic endocrine syndromes ====
- MeSH C04.730.713.317 – acth syndrome, ectopic
- MeSH C04.730.713.988 – zollinger-ellison syndrome

==== MeSH C04.730.856 – paraneoplastic syndromes, nervous system ====
- MeSH C04.730.856.112 – Anti-N-Methyl-D-Aspartate Receptor Encephalitis
- MeSH C04.730.856.437 – limbic encephalitis
- MeSH C04.730.856.490 – Myasthenia Gravis
  - MeSH C04.730.856.490.225 – Lambert-Eaton Myasthenic Syndrome
- MeSH C04.730.856.543 – myelitis, transverse
- MeSH C04.730.856.596 – Opsoclonus-Myoclonus Syndrome
- MeSH C04.730.856.650 – paraneoplastic cerebellar degeneration
- MeSH C04.730.856.700 – paraneoplastic polyneuropathy

=== MeSH C04.834 – precancerous conditions ===
==== MeSH C04.834.512 – leukoplakia ====
- MeSH C04.834.512.513 – leukoplakia, oral
  - MeSH C04.834.512.513.500 – leukoplakia, hairy

==== MeSH C04.834.818 – uterine cervical dysplasia ====
- MeSH C04.834.818.249 – Atypical Squamous Cells of the Cervix
- MeSH C04.834.818.500 – Squamous Intraepithelial Lesions of the Cervix

=== MeSH C04.850 – pregnancy complications, neoplastic ===
==== MeSH C04.850.908 – trophoblastic neoplasms ====
- MeSH C04.850.908.208 – Choriocarcinoma
  - MeSH C04.850.908.208.438 – Choriocarcinoma, Non-gestational
  - MeSH C04.850.908.208.875 – trophoblastic tumor, placental site
- MeSH C04.850.908.416 – gestational trophoblastic neoplasms
  - MeSH C04.850.908.416.750 – hydatidiform mole
    - MeSH C04.850.908.416.750.500 – Hydatidiform Mole, Invasive

The list continues at List of MeSH codes (C05).
