= Lhermitte–Duclos disease =

Lhermitte-Duclos disease (LDD)
- Other names: Dysplastic gangliocytoma of the cerebellum (DGC)
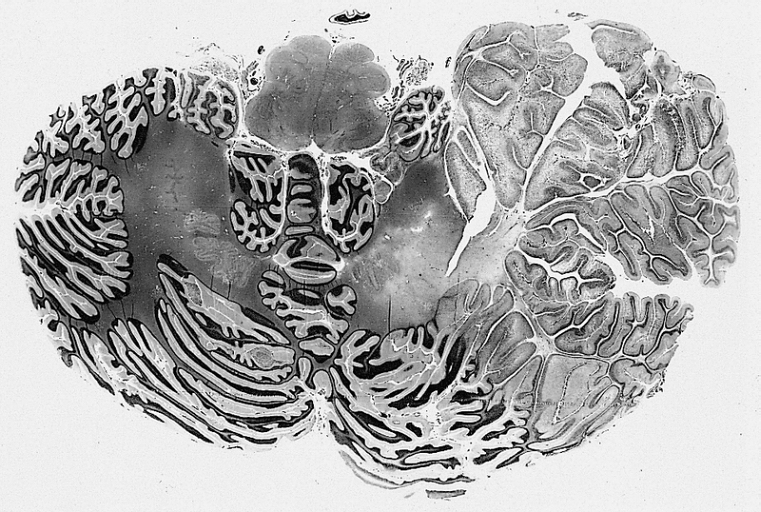
- Lhermitte-Duclos disease histology
- Specialty: Neuro-oncology
- Frequency: 0.0001%

Lhermitte–Duclos disease (LDD) (English: /ˌlɛərˈmiːtˌduːˈkloʊ/), also called dysplastic gangliocytoma of the cerebellum (DGC), is a rare, slowly growing tumor of the cerebellum, a gangliocytoma sometimes considered to be a hamartoma, characterized by diffuse hypertrophy of the granular layer of the cerebellum. It is often associated with Cowden syndrome. It was described by Jacques Jean Lhermitte and P. Duclos in 1920.

== Signs and symptoms ==
Main clinical signs and symptoms include:

- headache
- movement disorders
- tremor
- visual disturbances
- abnormal EEG
- Diplopia

Patients with Lhermitte–Duclos disease and Cowden's syndrome may also have multiple growths on skin. The tumor, though benign, may cause neurological injury including abnormal movements. On a brain MRI, a characteristic sign in a patient with LDD is alternating bands of high and low intensity called a tiger-stripe pattern.

MICROSCOPY (lhermitte-duclos disease)

1. Enlarged circumscribed cerebellar folia
2. internal granular layer is focally indistinct and is occupied by large ganglion cells
3. myelinated tracks in outer molecular layer
4. underlying white matter is atrophic and gliotic

== Pathophysiology ==
In Lhermitte–Duclos disease, the cerebellar cortex loses its normal architecture, and forms a hamartoma in the cerebellar hemispheres. The tumors are usually found on the left cerebellar hemisphere, and consist of abnormal hypertrophic ganglion cells that are somewhat similar to Purkinje cells. The amount of white matter in the cerebellum is diminished. Like cowden syndrome, patients with Lhermitte–Duclos disease often have mutations in enzymes involved in the Akt/PKB signaling pathway, which plays a role in cell growth. Mutation in PTEN gene on chromosome no. 10q leads to increased activity of AKT and mTOR pathways, and patients should be tested for these mutations because they may be at risk of other tumors and cancers in other parts of the body.

== Treatment ==
Treatment is not needed in the asymptomatic patient. Symptomatic patients may benefit from surgical debulking of the tumor. Complete tumor removal is not usually needed and can be difficult due to the tumor location.

== Epidemiology ==
Lhermitte–Duclos disease is a rare entity; approximately 222 cases of LDD have been reported in medical literature. Symptoms of the disease most commonly manifest in the third and fourth decades of life, although it may onset at any age. Men and women are equally affected, and there is not any apparent geographical pattern.

== History ==
The disease was first described in 1920 by Lhermitte and Duclos.

== See also ==
- Multiple hamartoma syndrome
- List of cutaneous conditions
