= Bannayan–Riley–Ruvalcaba syndrome =

- Other names: BRRS
- Autosomal dominant is the manner in which this condition is inherited
- Specialty: Oncology, medical genetics
- Symptoms: Enlarged head
- Causes: Mutations in the PTEN gene
- Diagnostic method: Based on signs and symptoms
- Treatment: Based on symptoms

Bannayan–Riley–Ruvalcaba syndrome (BRRS) is a rare overgrowth syndrome and hamartomatous disorder with occurrence of multiple subcutaneous lipomas, macrocephaly and hemangiomas. The disease is inherited in an autosomal dominant manner. The disease belongs to a family of hamartomatous polyposis syndromes, which also includes Peutz–Jeghers syndrome, juvenile polyposis and Cowden syndrome. Mutation of the PTEN gene underlies this syndrome, as well as Cowden syndrome, Proteus syndrome, and Proteus-like syndrome, these four syndromes are referred to as PTEN Hamartoma-Tumor Syndromes.

== Signs and symptoms ==
Bannayan–Riley–Ruvalcaba syndrome is associated with enlarged head and benign mesodermal hamartomas (multiple hemangiomas, and intestinal polyps). Dysmorphy as well as delayed neuropsychomotor development can also be present.

Some individuals have thyroid issues consistent with multinodular goiter, thyroid adenoma, differentiated non-medullary thyroid cancer, most lesions are slowly growing. Visceral as well as intracranial involvement may occur in some cases, and can cause bleeding and symptomatic mechanical compression

== Genetics ==
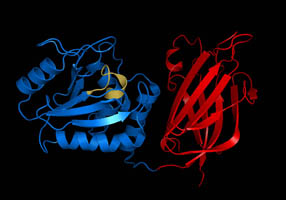
PTEN

The genetics of the Bannayan–Riley–Ruvalcaba syndrome is determined, in the majority of cases, via the PTEN gene which presents about 30 mutations in this condition. This gene which regulates cell growth, when not working properly can lead to hamartomas. PTEN chromosomal location is 10q23.31, while the molecular location is 87,863,438 to 87,971,930

There are many syndromes that are linked to PTEN aside from Bannayan–Riley–Ruvalcaba Syndrome.

The syndrome combines Bannayan–Zonana syndrome, Riley–Smith syndrome, and Ruvalcaba–Myhre–Smith syndrome.

Bannayan–Zonana syndrome is named for George A. Bannayan and Jonathan Zonana

== Diagnosis ==
In terms of diagnosing Bannayan–Riley–Ruvalcaba syndrome there is no current method outside the physical characteristics that may be present as signs/symptoms. There are, however, multiple molecular genetics tests (and cytogenetic test) to determine Bannayan–Riley–Ruvalcaba syndrome.

=== Differential diagnosis ===
The differential diagnosis for BRRS consists of the following:

- Juvenile polyposis syndrome
- Peutz–Jeghers syndrome
- Proteus syndrome
- Neurofibromatosis 1
- Cowden syndrome

== Treatment ==
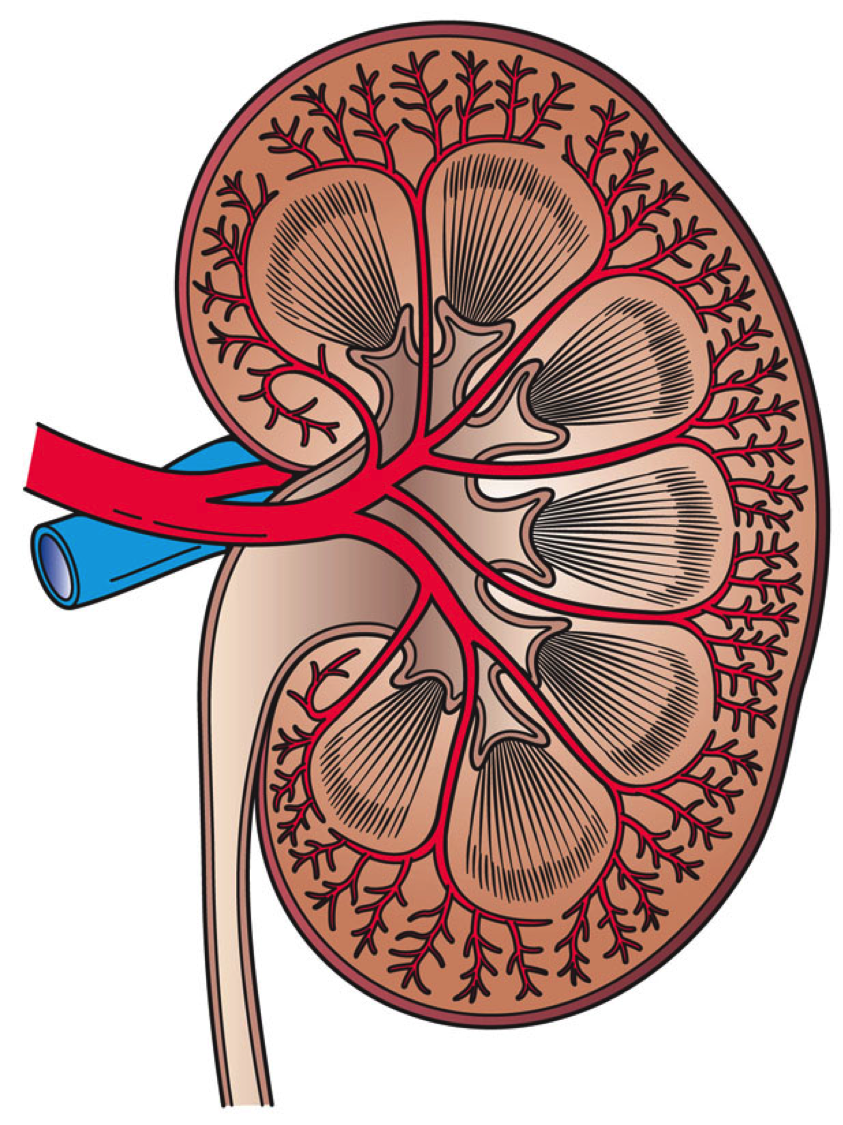
Kidney

In terms of management one should observe what signs or symptoms are present and therefore treat those as there is no other current guideline. The affected individual should be monitored for cancer of:

- Thyroid
- Breast
- Renal

== See also ==
- List of cutaneous conditions
- List of cutaneous neoplasms associated with systemic syndromes
