= Medullary carcinoma =

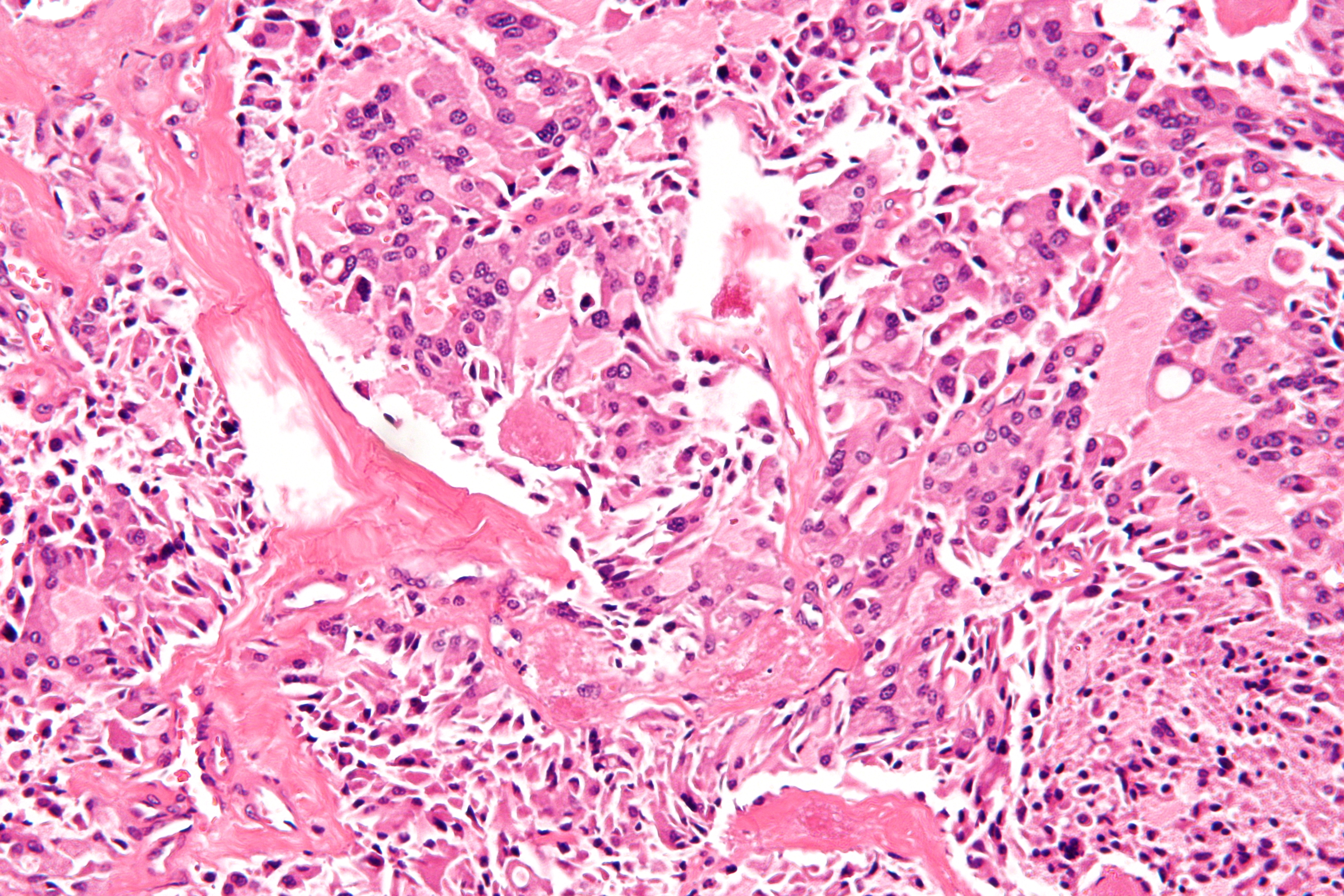
- Micrograph of a medullary carcinoma of the thyroid. H&E stain.
- Specialty: Oncology

Medullary carcinoma may refer to one of several different tumors of epithelial origin. As the term "medulla" is a generic anatomic descriptor for the mid-layer of various organ tissues, a medullary tumor usually arises from the "mid-layer tissues" of the relevant organ.

Medullary carcinoma most commonly refers to:

- Medullary thyroid cancer
- Medullary breast carcinoma

Medullary carcinoma may also refer to tumors of the:

- Ampulla of Vater
- Gallbladder
- Kidney (Renal medullary carcinoma)
- Large intestine
- Pancreas
- Stomach
