= Nevi and melanomas =

- Specialty: Oncology

Nevi and melanomas are a group of neoplasia.

Although a nevus and a melanoma are often treated as independent entities, there is evidence that a nevus can be a precursor for a melanoma.

Common mutations have been identified in nevi and melanomas.

== See also ==
- List of cutaneous conditions
