= Ductal carcinoma =

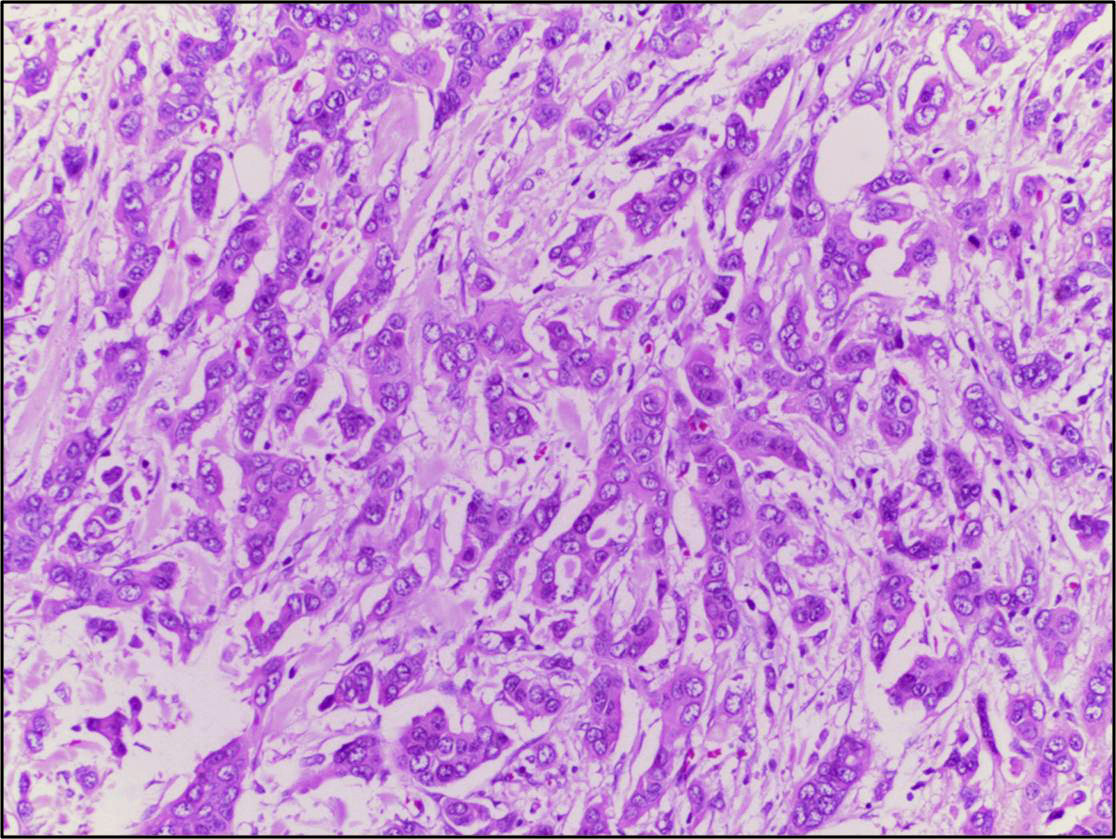
- Micrograph of breast tissue with ductal carcinoma. H&E stain.

Ductal carcinoma is a type of tumor that primarily presents in the ducts of a gland.

Types include:

- Mammary
  - Ductal carcinoma in situ
  - Invasive ductal carcinoma
- Pancreatic ductal carcinoma
