= Gliosarcoma =

- Other names: Sarcomatous glioblastoma
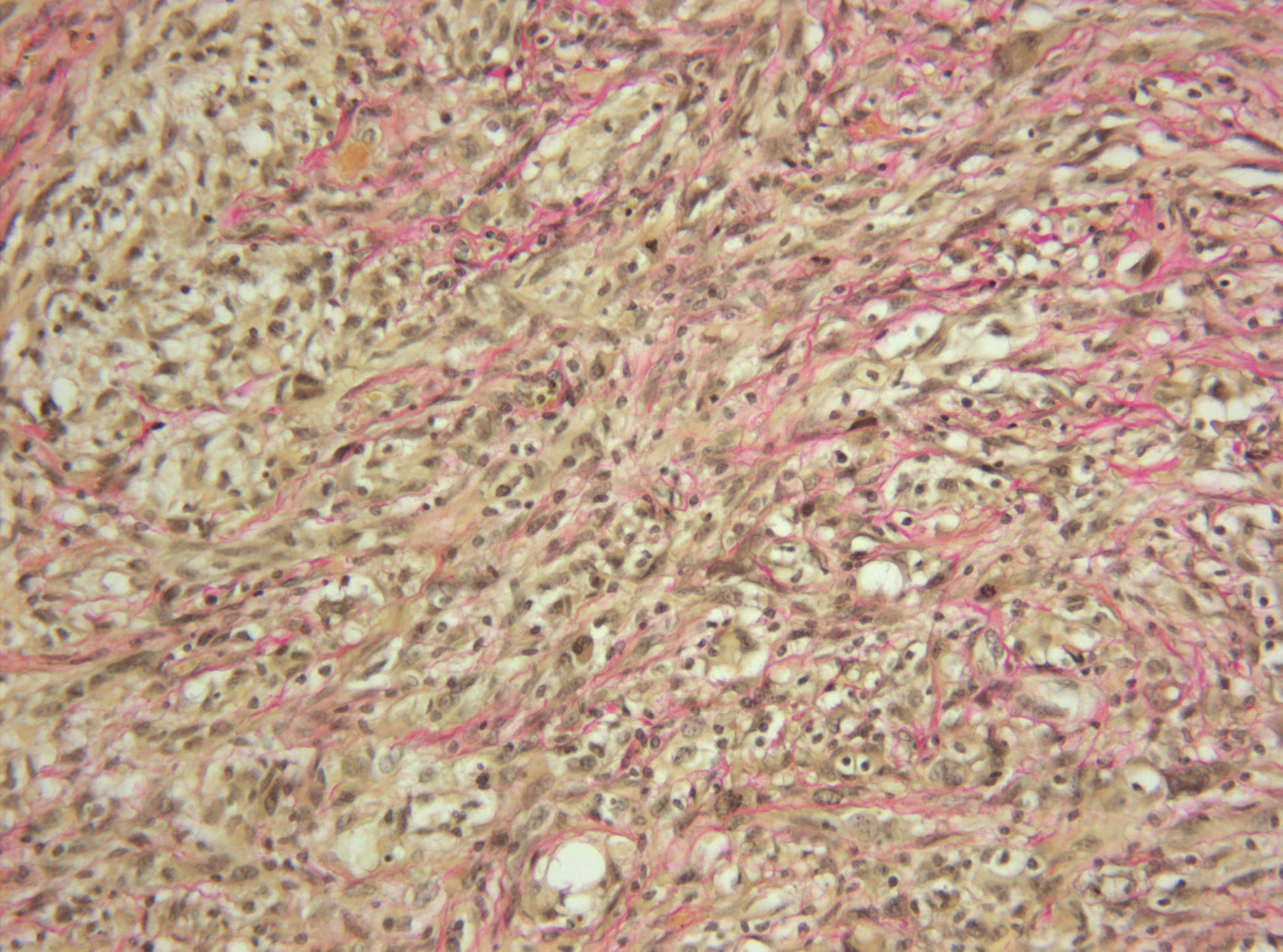
- Micrograph showing a gliosarcoma. Elastic van Gieson's stain.
- Specialty: Neuro-oncology
- Usual onset: Between 40 and 60 years old
- Prognosis: Five-year survival rate: 5.6%
- Frequency: ~215 new diagnoses per year (United States)

Gliosarcoma is a rare type of glioma, a cancer of the brain that comes from glial, or supportive, brain cells, as opposed to the neural brain cells. Gliosarcoma is a malignant cancer, and is defined as a glioblastoma consisting of gliomatous and sarcomatous components. Primary gliosarcoma (PGS) is classified as a grade IV tumor and a subtype of glioblastoma multiforme in the 2007 World Health Organization classification system (GBM). Because of a lack of specific and clear diagnostic criteria, the word "gliosarcoma" was frequently used to refer to glial tumours with mesenchymal properties, such as the ability to make collagen and reticulin.

It is estimated that approximately 2.1% of all glioblastomas are gliosarcomas. Although most gliomas rarely show metastases outside the cerebrum, gliosarcomas have a propensity to do so, most commonly spreading through the blood to the lungs, and also liver and lymph nodes.

They most commonly present in the temporal lobe and frontal lobe.

== Pathogenesis ==
Early reports claimed that the hyperplastic blood vessels that are frequently present in high grade gliomas underwent neoplastic change to become the sarcomatous components. Feigin's early reports components of perivascular sarcomatous and hyperplastic arteries in gliosarcoma offered evidence for the "collision tumor" hypothesis. Also, Studies demonstrating the sarcomatous component's histological sensitivity to markers of vascular endothelium such factor CD34, von Willebrand factor, and VIII supported this theory. An alternative view that has recently gained support suggests that both gliosarcoma components have a monoclonal origin, with the sarcomatous component deriving from abnormal differentiation of malignant gliomal mesenchyma. First, gliomatous and sarcomatous components were shown to have similar p53 alterations by Biernat and colleagues. In both tumor regions, Reis and colleagues found similar nuclear accumulation of p53, deletion of p16, mutations of PTEN, and amplifications of CDK4. Other scientists then noted that both gliosarcoma components had similar genetic changes and chromosomal abnormalities of the kind often seen in GBM.

== Clinical characteristics ==
Gliosarcoma is rare; incidence ranges from 1.8 to 2.8 percent lower than that of GBMs. PGS affects persons in their 6th to 7th years of life, and it is much more frequent in males than in females (with 1.4–1.8:1 ratio). Depending on where the tumor is located, the reported presenting signs and symptoms, such as aphasia, headaches, hemiparesis, seizures, and cognitive loss, are similar with those of a fast developing intracranial tumor. Many researchers have come to the conclusion that these tumors are clinically identical to GBM due to their clinical similarities.

== Imaging ==
On CT imaging, the lesions might show as Well-defined high-density lesion edges and homogeneous enhancement, replicating the meningioma appearance, or as lesions with large necrotic regions and GBM-like heterogeneous contrast enhancement. Marked peritumoral edema is a characteristic and frequent hallmark of gliosarcomas observed on MRI.

== Metastasis ==
GBM and other cerebral gliomas rarely metastasize outside the brain. Numerous authors described incidences of metastatic foci that mixed gliomatous and sarcomatous components, while others reported metastatic foci that were entirely composed of the sarcomatous component. Most gliosarcoma extracranial metastases are found in the lung and liver, but there have been reports of metastases elsewhere as well, including evidence of intramedullary metastases to the cervical spine.

== Treatment ==
Tumor removal, postoperative radiation treatment, and chemotherapy with nitrosureas, misonidazole, dacarbazine, temozolomide, doxorubicin, vincristine, cisplatin, mithramycin, ametophterin, thalidomide, or irinotecan have all been recorded as treatment options for gliosarcoma and radiotherapy with temozolomide.

== Prognosis ==
PGS has a poor prognosis, a prognosis of median survival of 4 months in untreated individuals. The National Cancer Institute states that the relative five-year survival rate of gliosarcoma is only 5.6%.
