= Intestinal neoplasms =

Intestinal neoplasms can refer to:

- Small intestine cancer
- Colorectal cancer
