= Acanthoma =

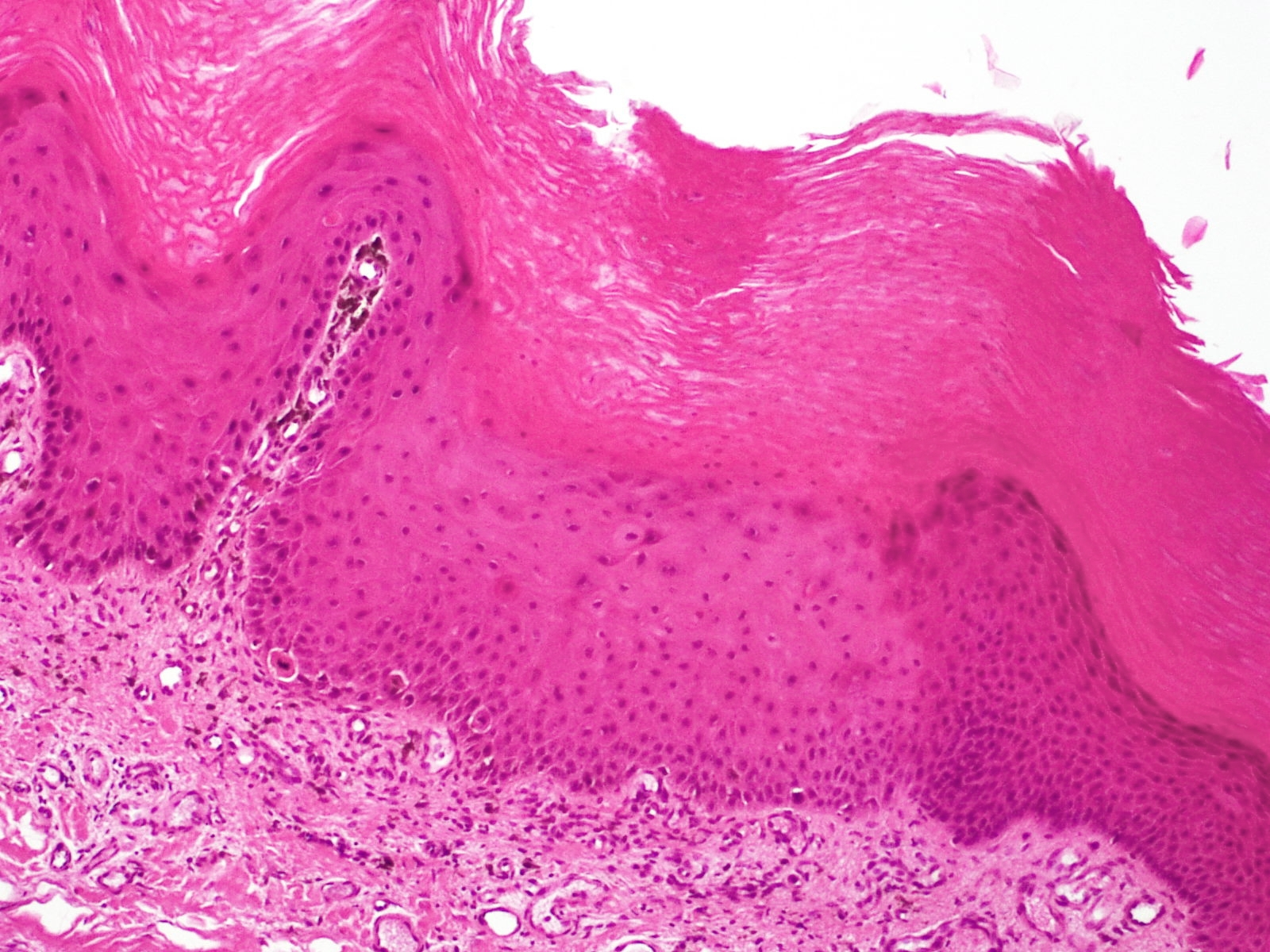
- Acanthoma macrocellulare (magn. 10×)
- Specialty: Oncology

An acanthoma is a skin neoplasm composed of squamous or epidermal cells. It is located in the prickle cell layer.

Types of acanthoma include pilar sheath acanthoma, a benign follicular tumor usually of the upper lip; clear cell acanthoma, a benign tumor found most frequently on the legs; and Degos acanthoma, often confused with but unrelated to Degos disease.

== History ==
In 2005, "Acanthoma" was added to MeSH as an index term; previous indexing was "Skin Neoplasms" (1965–2004). At that time, PubMed indexed only 206 articles with the term "acanthoma" (the term usually in the title or abstract).
