= Myopericytoma =

- Other names: Glomangiopericytoma
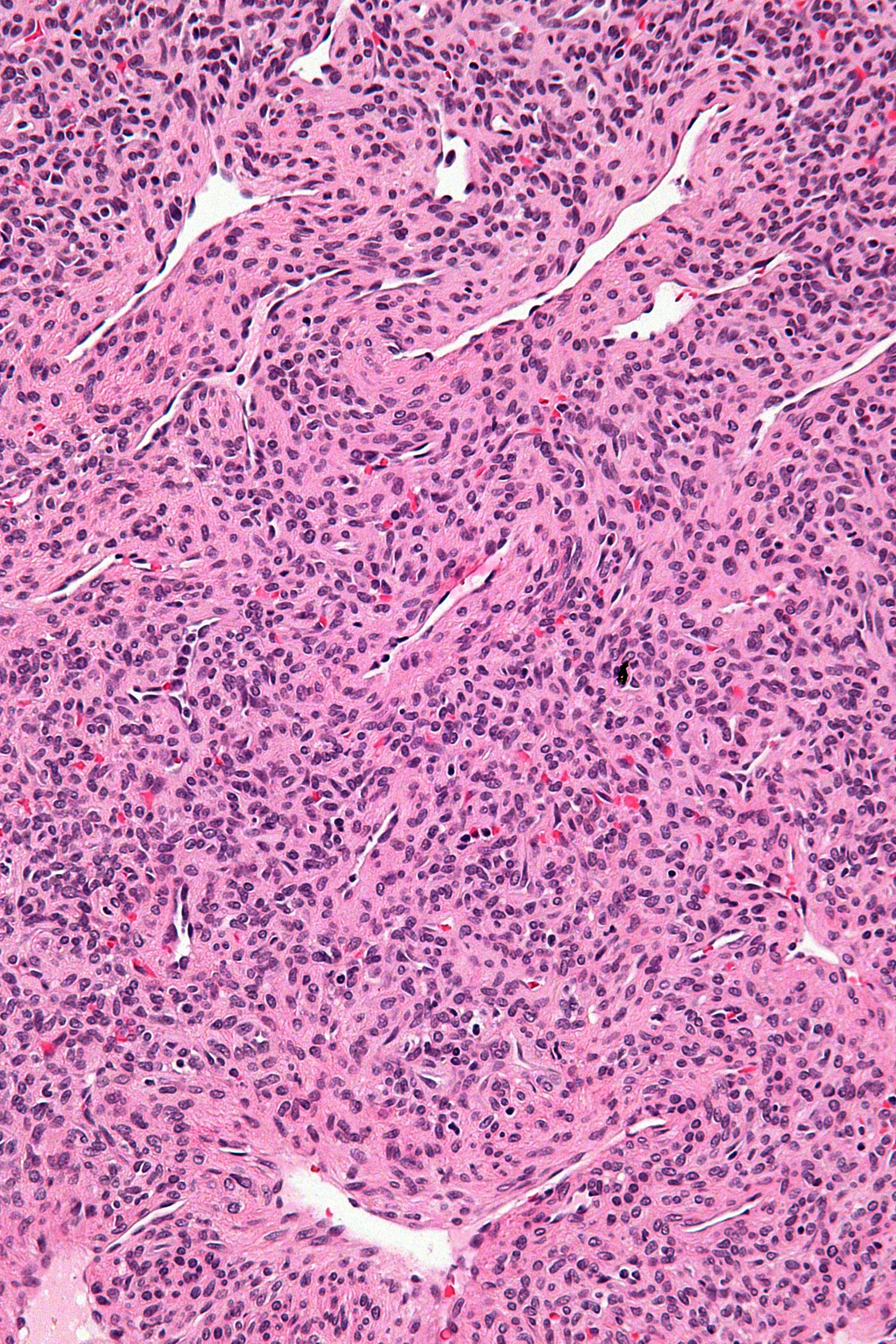
- Micrograph of a myopericytoma. H&E stain.
- Specialty: Oncology

Myopericytoma is a rare perivascular soft tissue tumour. It is usually benign and typically in the distal extremities.

It is thought to overlap with myofibroma.

== See also ==
- Glomus tumour
