= Myxosarcoma =

- Specialty: Oncology

Myxosarcoma is a rare malignant tumor of the heart.
