= Serous cystadenoma =

Serous cystadenoma may refer to:

- Ovarian serous cystadenoma, a very common benign tumour of the ovary
- Pancreatic serous cystadenoma, also known as serous microcystic adenoma
