= Adenomatoid tumor =

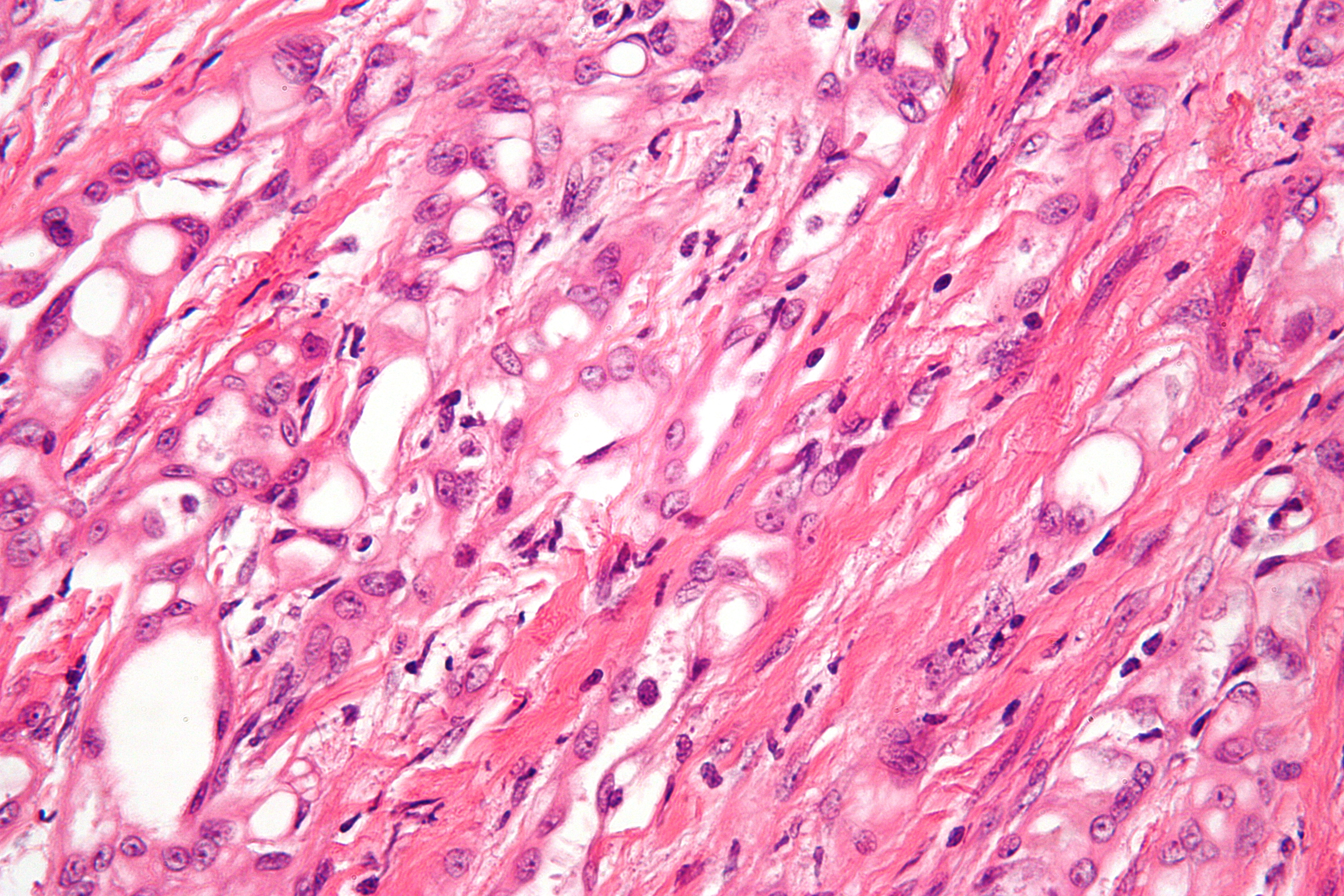
- High-magnification micrograph of an adenomatoid tumor. H&E stain.
- Specialty: Oncology

Adenomatoid tumors are rare and benign mesothelial tumors, which arise from the lining of organs. It mainly presents in the genital tract, in regions such as the testis and epididymis. Because of this, researchers had a difficult time concluding that type of tumor has a mesothelial origin. Immunohistochemistry staining of tumor samples show that it is indeed positive for mesothelial-markers (calretinin, WT1, and CK6). It is the most common extratesticular neoplasm after lipoma, and accounts for 30% of these masses. On the other hand, adenomatoid tumors are the most common tumors of testicular adnexa. Although they are more common to be found in the paratesticular region they are sometimes found in the intratesticular region. It also has been found in other organs such as the pancreas, liver, mesocolon, and adrenal glands. In the female, it has been found in the body of the uterus and the fallopian tube. Most adenomatoid tumors do not cause much pain and can go unnoticed for a long time. Of course, there are a few exceptions to this absence of pain. An example of this is when adenomatoid tumors grow too close to testicular adnexal structures. Tumors of this kind are usually found to be asymptomatic and easily treatable.

== Pathology ==
While adenomatoid tumors are present in both the various body areas of males and females, one study discovered that these tumors were more likely to occur in Caucasian males. Adenomatoid tumors can be found in a widespread age of people ranging from 18 to 79 years old. Most of these tumors are not spotted until about the 30s. This asymptomatic nature is because a majority of adenomatoid tumors grow silently and are sometimes dormant without causing any pain. This is what contributes to the difficulty of catching adenomatoid tumors.

These benign tumors can grow up to 5.0 centimeters (most of them range around to 2.0 cm). Although adenomatoid tumors are not known to infiltrate surrounding tissues, it is possible that there are multiple adenomatoid tumors in the same area.

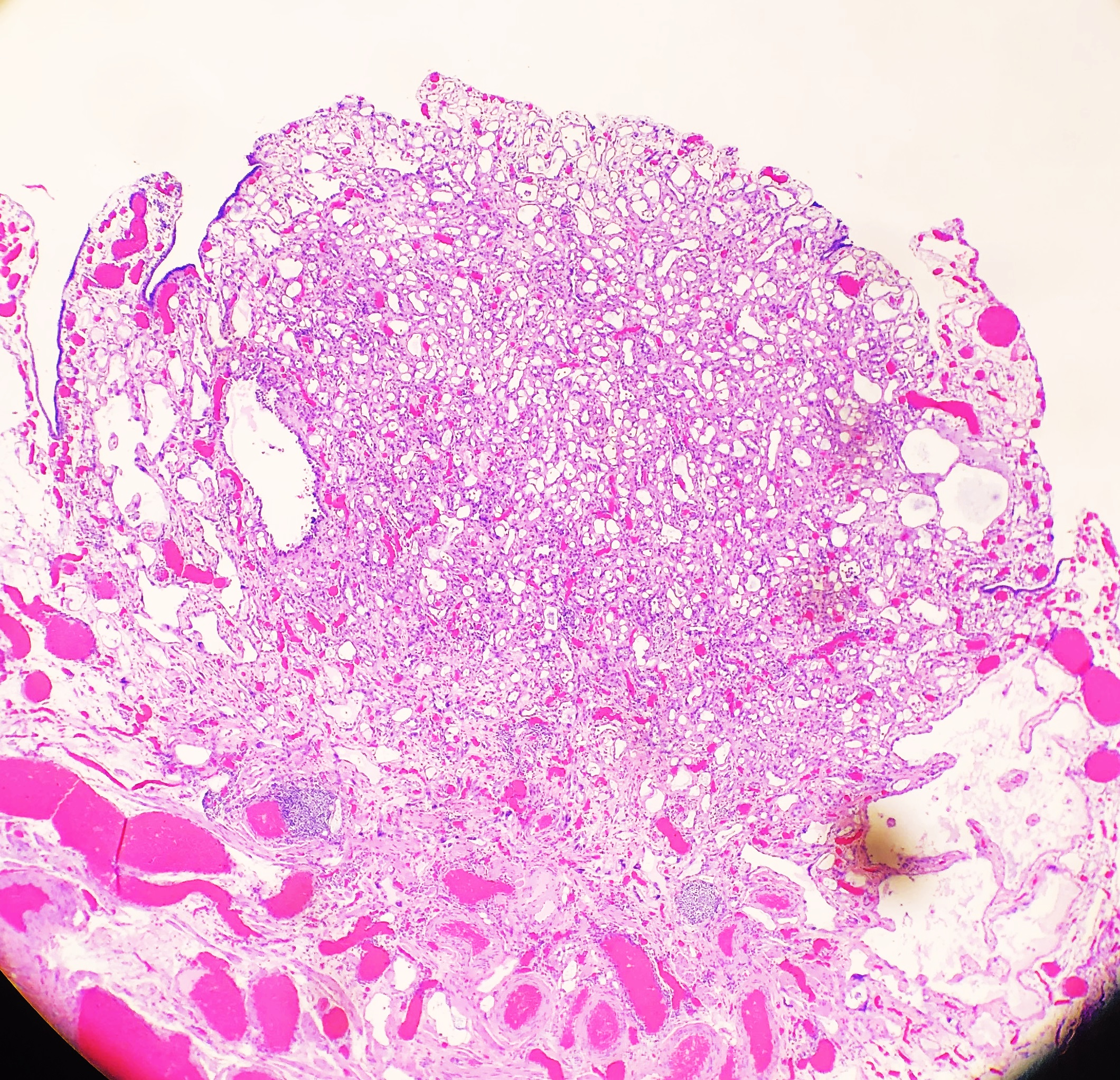
An adenomatoid tumor of the fallopian tube, low magnification, displaying infiltrative-like borders.

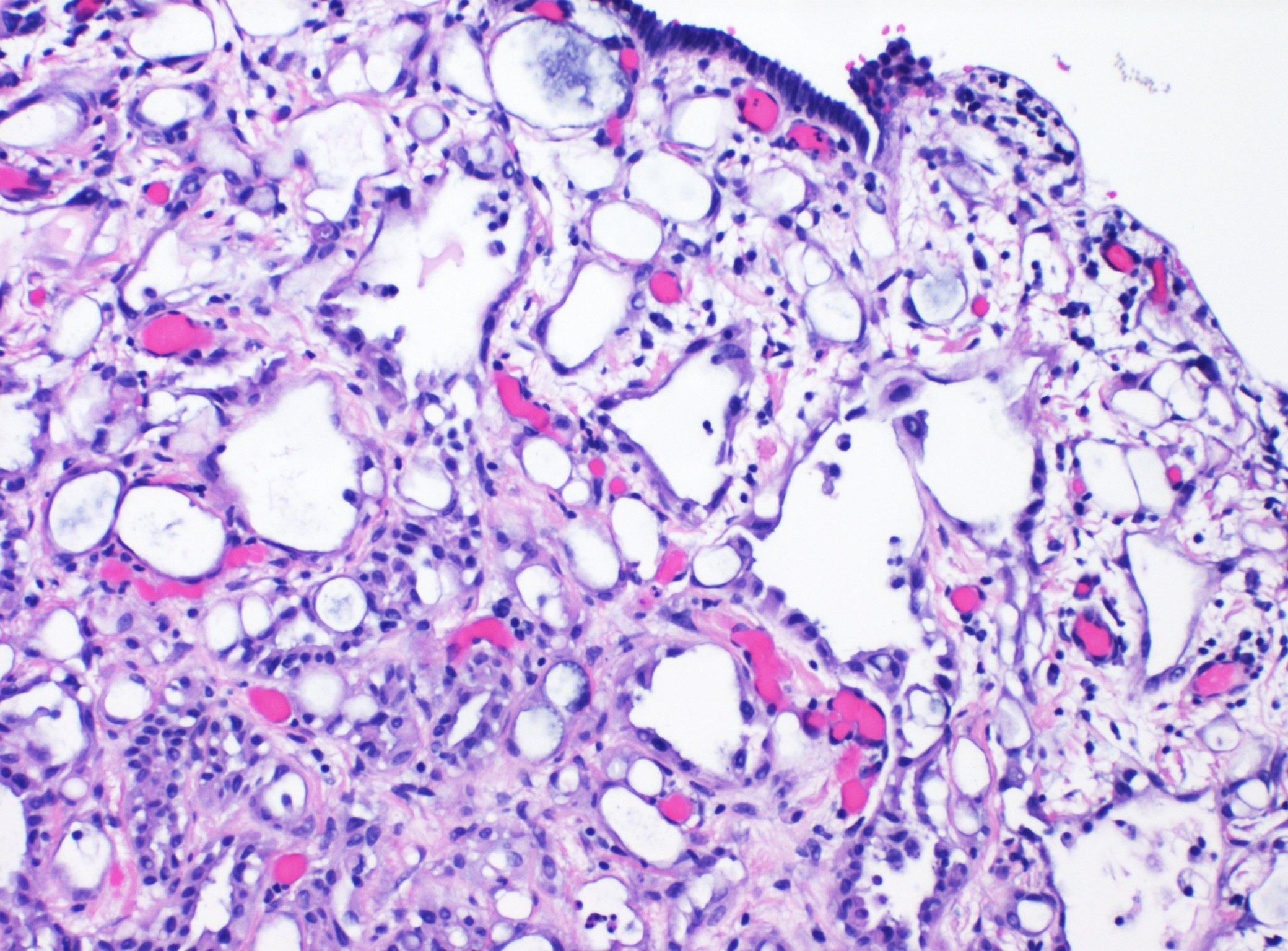
High magnification of the same case, showing the typical features of tubular spaces of varying size composed of flattened cells resembling endothelium.

== Ancillary Studies ==
=== Immunohistochemistry ===
Given their mesothelial origin, the cells lining the spaces are positive for cytokeratins, WT1, D2-40, and calretinin. They are negative for MOC31, BerEP4, and vascular markers (CD31 or CD34). BAP1 expression is retained. L1 cell adhesion molecule (L1CAM), a marker of NF-kB pathway activation, has been shown to be expressed in adenomatoid tumors (and negative in other benign mesothelial tissues and mesothelioma).

=== Molecular analysis ===
Adenomatoid tumors of the female and male genital tract are characterized by somatic missense mutations in the TRAF7 gene, which leads to aberrant NF-kB pathway activation. Unlike some malignant mesotheliomas, adenomatoid tumors do not harbor CDKN2A deleterious mutations.

== Imaging ==
In order to see adenomatoid tumors multiple imaging modalities are used. These tumors appear to be small, solid, and circumscribed with a color that usually ranges from white to tan.

Ultrasound, MRI, and CT scans are all used to identify whether a patient has adenomatoid tumors. The shape, location, and activity of the tumor are all important information to attain. Each imaging modality has its own strengths and weaknesses. Dynamic contrast enhanced MRI can differentiate tumors from disorders in the testicular region. Misdiagnosing something can sometimes cause more damage than doing nothing. One weakness of adenomatoid tumor ultrasound imaging is that it is only possible if the tumor is hyperechoic. Ultrasonically can help identify if it fits this category or not. This specific characteristic in adenomatoid tumors is variable and can determine whether or not ultrasound is the right technique for the job. Having other options available to identify the tumor helps fill in the gap when ultrasound is not possible. MRI and CT imaging are usually helpful when scanning the adrenal gland for tumors.

== Treatment ==
If located in the testes region, removal of the tumor must be handled with great care to prevent damage to testosterone production and keep the patient fertile. If removal of the tumor is necessary then an excision biopsy is usually done on the patient. Though this can be used as both a diagnostic and removal procedure, it has proven to be effective. Successful procedures results in a tumor free area that is not prone recur.

When used as a diagnosis tool, the excision biopsy can collect a tissue sample from the tumor. Through histological evaluation the lesion can be categorized in the patients.

== Additional images ==
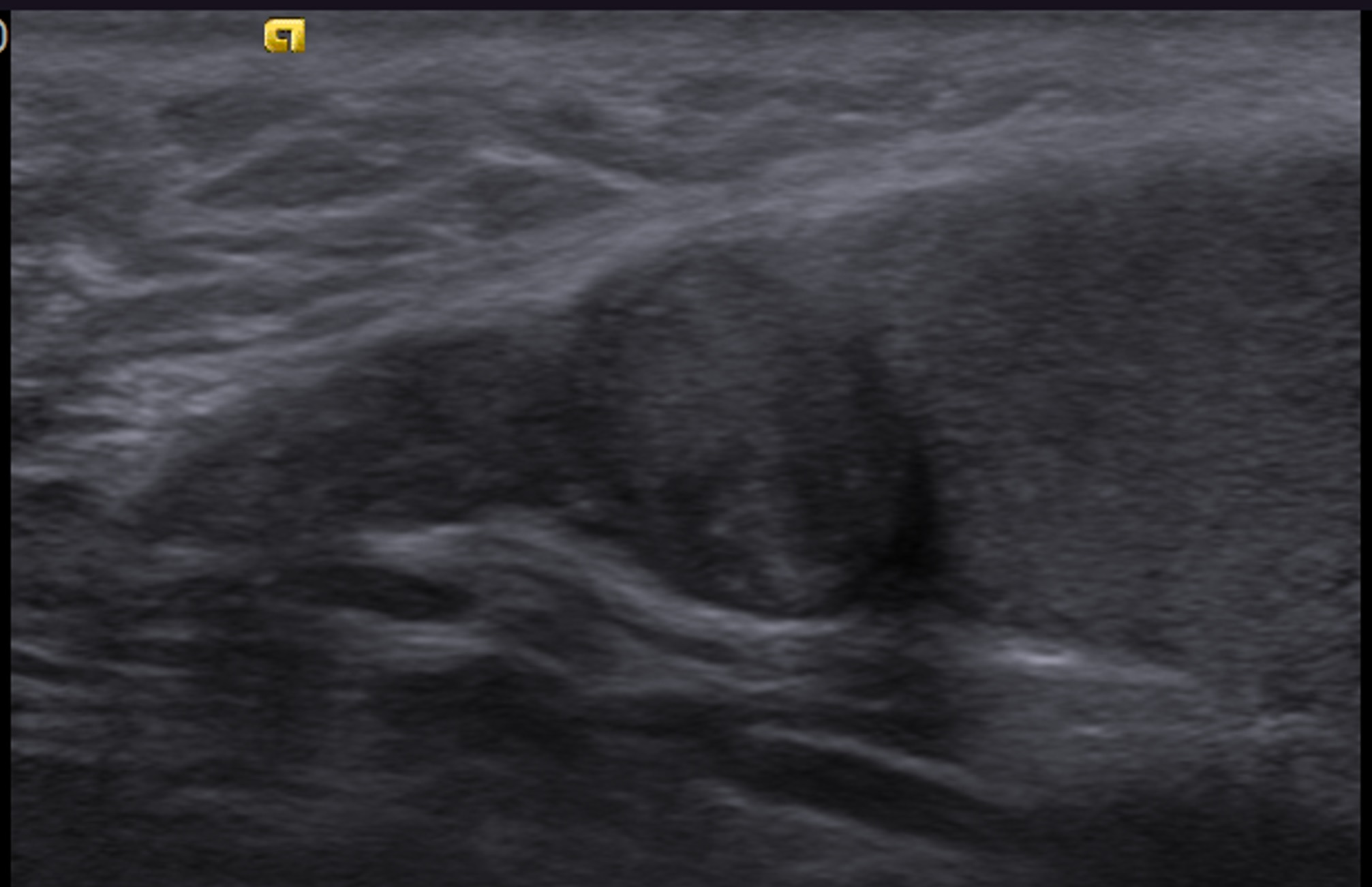
Adenomatoid tumour of the epididymis
