= Myosarcoma =

- Specialty: Oncology

Myosarcoma is a malignant muscle tumor. People with myosarcoma often wake up with the feeling as if they had a cramp during their sleep.

Leiomyosarcoma is sarcoma of smooth muscle, and rhabdomyosarcoma is sarcoma of striated muscle. However, the term myosarcoma itself still appears in the literature.
