= Trophoblastic neoplasm =

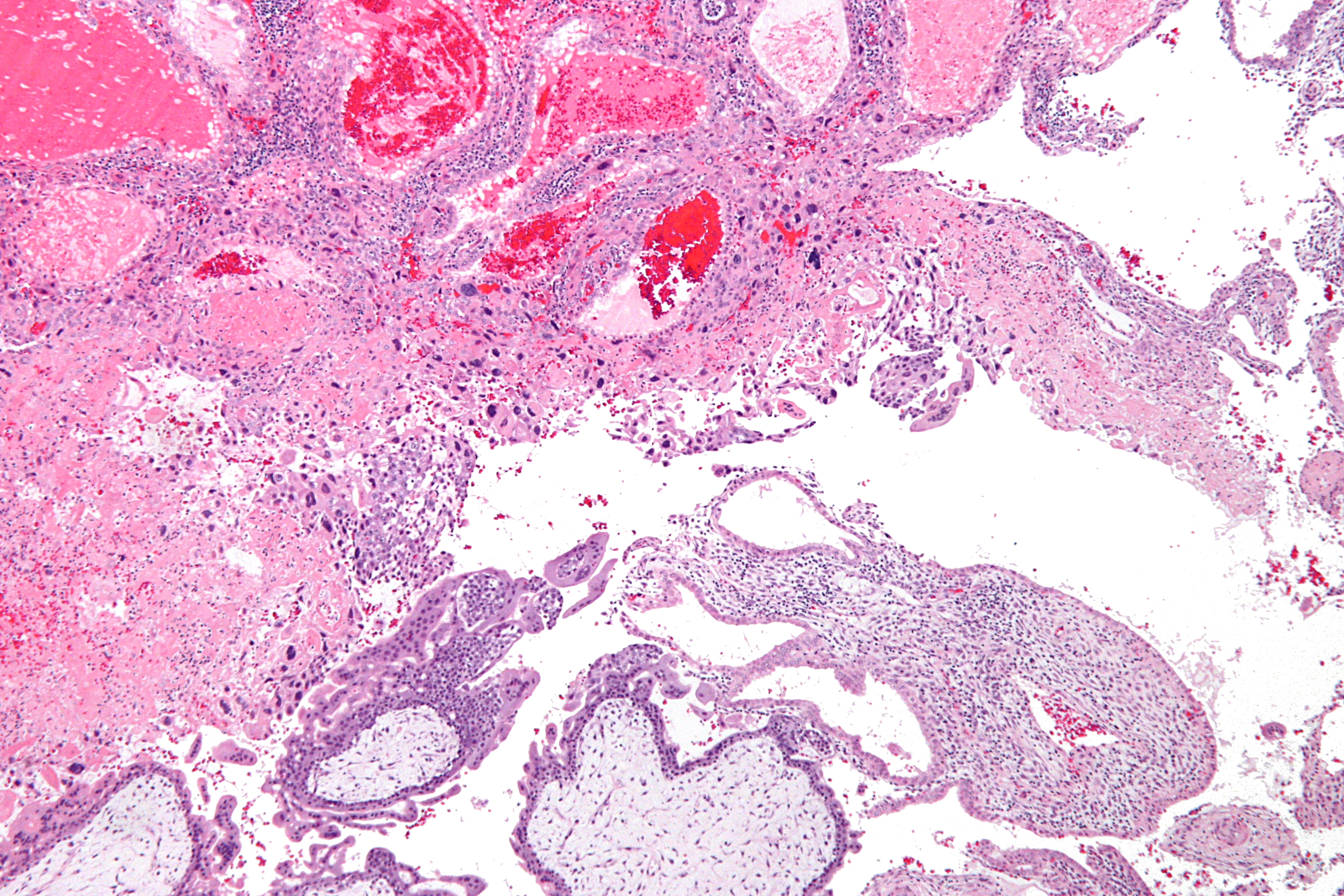
- Micrograph of intermediate trophoblast and a hydatidiform mole (bottom of image). H&E stain.
- Specialty: Oncology

Gestational trophoblastic neoplasia (GTN) is group of rare diseases related to pregnancy and included in gestational trophoblastic disease (GTD) in which abnormal trophoblast cells grow in the uterus. GTN can be classified into benign and malignant lesions. Benign lesions include placental site nodule and hydatidiform moles while malignant lesions have four subtypes including invasive mole, gestational choriocarcinoma, placental site trophoblastic tumor (PSTT) and epithelioid trophoblastic tumor (ETT). The choriocarcinoma has 2 significant subtypes including gestational and non-gestational and they are differentiated by their different biological feature and prognosis. Signs and symptoms of GTN will appear vary from person to person and depending upon the type of the disease. They may include uterine bleeding not related to menstruation, pain or pressure in pelvis, large uterus and high blood pressure during pregnancy. The cause of this disease is unknown but the identification of the tumor based on total beta-human chorionic gonadotropin (β-hCG) in the serum.

Management of GTN requires pathology review, treatment options and monitoring of hCG. Therefore, it can be treated with curettage, hysterectomy and single agent or multi agent chemotherapy. Although this group of diseases are highly susceptible to chemotherapy, prognosis depends on the type of GTN and whether the tumor has spread to other areas of the body.

== Cause and Risk factors ==
The exact cause of gestational trophoblastic neoplasia (GTN) is unknown. GTN often arises after molar pregnancies but can also occur after any gestation including miscarriages and term pregnancies. Although risk factors may impact on the development of the tumor, most do not directly cause of disease. According to some studies, the risk of complete molar pregnancy is highest in women over age 35 and younger than 20. The risk is even higher for women over age 45.

== Signs and symptoms ==
The symptoms of GTN will vary from person to person. People with the same disease may not have all the symptoms listed.

- Most common presenting symptom is vaginal bleeding, which is associated with mild elevation of serum β hCG (< 2,500 IU/L). Vaginal bleeding may also occur after delivery that continues for longer than normal.
- A uterus that is larger than expected during pregnancy
- Pain or pressure in the pelvis.
- Severe nausea and vomiting during pregnancy.
- High blood pressure with headache and swelling of feet and hands early in the pregnancy.
- Fatigue, shortness of breath, dizziness, and a fast or irregular heartbeat caused by anemia.
- If metastases are present, signs and symptoms associated with the metastatic disease and more severe symptoms may be present.

== Diagnosis ==
Initial screening tests for GTN include:

- Internal pelvic exam: to check for lumps or anything unusual changes.
- Ultrasound exam of the pelvis: Also called a sonogram, an ultrasound creates a picture of the internal organ. In a transvaginal ultrasound, an ultrasound wand is inserted into the vagina and directed at the uterus to take the pictures.
- Blood chemistry studies: It can be done to check the levels of certain hormones and other substances that may be impacted by the presence of GTN.
- Serum tumor marker test: For GTN, the blood is checked for the level of β-hCG, a hormone that is made by the body during pregnancy. β-hCG in the blood of a woman who is not pregnant may be a sign of GTN and also helpful tests to monitor a woman's recovery during and after treatment. Placental side trophoblastic tumor (PSTT) is differentiated by low β-hCG levels because it is a neoplastic proliferation of intermediate trophoblastic cells.
- Urinalysis: A test to check the color of urine and its contents, such as sugar, protein, blood, bacteria, and the level of β-hCG.
- Spinal tap: Cerebrospinal fluid is tested for high amounts of the hormone β-hCG if the GTN has spread to the brain or spinal cord.
- Computed tomography (CT): A CT scan can be used to measure the tumor's size.
- Chest x-ray: It may be done if the tumor has spread outside of the uterus.

=== Tumor staging ===
FIGO (International Federation of Gynecology and Obstetrics) 2000 Anatomical staging is commonly used to evaluate stage of GTN.

Stage I - Disease confined to the uterus

Stage II - GTN extends outside of the uterus, but is limited to the genital structures (adnexa, vagina, broad ligament)

Stage III - GTN extends to the lungs, with or without known genital tract involvement

Stage IV - All other metastatic sites

== Pathophysiology ==
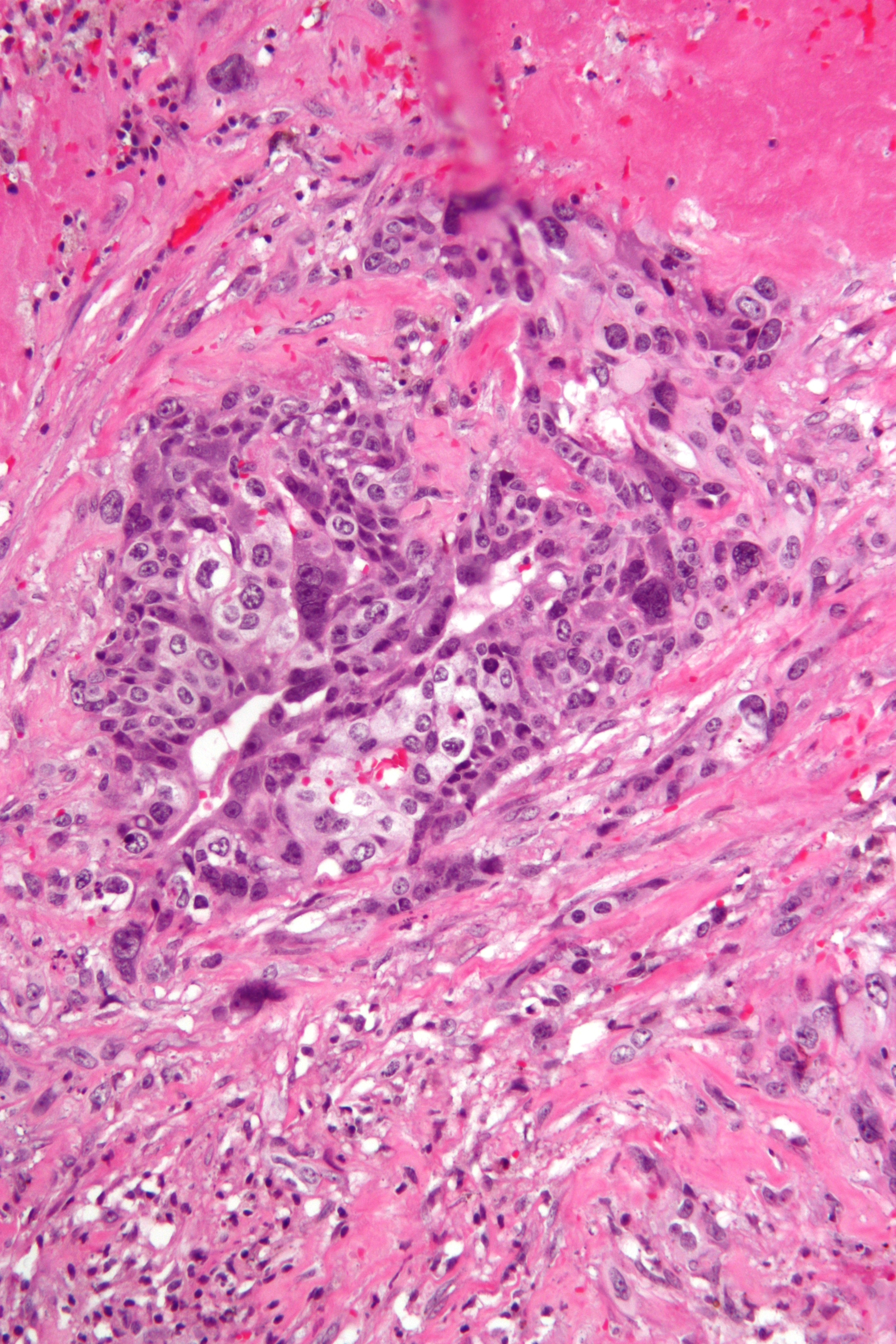
High magnification micrograph of choriocarcinoma. H&E stain.

All types of gestational trophoblastic neoplasia originate from the placenta. A placenta develops in the uterus during pregnancy and becomes first site of nutrient and gas exchange between mother and fetus. It has two components such as fetal component and mother component. A fetal component is composed of cytotrophoblast and syncytiotrophoblast. The exact pathogenesis of choriocarcinoma has not been fully understood, but studies have shown cytotrophoblast cells function as stem cells and transform into malignant form. The neoplastic cytotrophoblast further differentiates into either intermediate trophoblasts or syncytiotrophoblast.

== Treatment ==
Several treatment methods are available for GTN that include surgery, chemotherapy or combination of these. Surgery treatment is most common initial method for some types of the disease but it depends on the stage of the tumor. Common surgical options include dilation and curettage, and hysterectomy.

== Prognosis ==
FIGO modified Prognostic Scoring System. The system evaluates the patients to those with GTN as low-risk and high-risk based on several risk factors such as age, pregnancy or interval of pregnancies, size or metastases of tumor and prior chemotherapy. Each risk factors are rated at levels 0-4 scores. The numbers are then added up, and the overall score determines a woman's risk level.

- Women with a score of 6 or less are at low risk and tend to have a good prognosis regardless of how far the cancer has spread which usually respond well to chemotherapy.
- Women with a score of 7 or more are at high risk, and their tumors tend to respond less well to chemotherapy, even if they haven't spread much. They may require more intensive chemotherapy.

Therefore, some studies have shown that the condition is harder to cure if the cancer has spread to the liver or brain or β-hCG level is higher than 40,000 mIU/mL when treatment begins, cancer returns after having chemotherapy or symptoms/ pregnancy occurred for more than 4 months before treatment.

== Epidemiology ==
According to studies, GTN is found more frequently in Asia compared to North America or Europe. As of 2020, the reported incidence of choriocarcinoma ranges from 1 in 40 000 pregnancies in North America and Europe, to 9.2 and 3.3 per 40 000 pregnancies in Southeast Asia and Japan, respectively. Epidemiological studies have reported that hydatidiform mole appears to be caused by abnormal gametogenesis and fertilization more frequent at the extremes of reproductive age of younger than 15 and older than 45 years of age and pregnancies at these ages are a risk factor for hydatidiform mole. The risk increases after age 35 and there is a 5–10 times increased risk after 45 years.

== Research ==
Recently, in order to provide more comprehension tools of GTN pathogenesis, epigenetic modifications and molecular biology techniques could be applied for proper diagnosis, management, and treatment of such neoplasia. The progression of anti-angiogenesis therapy and molecular targeted cancer therapies would be capable of improving the therapeutic perspective among patients with drug resistance. Although chemotherapy and hysterectomy are currently used in a clinical setting, the use of diverse treatments including anti-body and gene therapy also being attempted to cure GTN. In addition, gene delivery tools using genetically engineered neural stem cells are presently being examined for the treatment of GTN and previous studies have indicated a significant inhibitory effect on tumor growth.
