= Ganglioglioma =

- Other names: Gangliocytoma
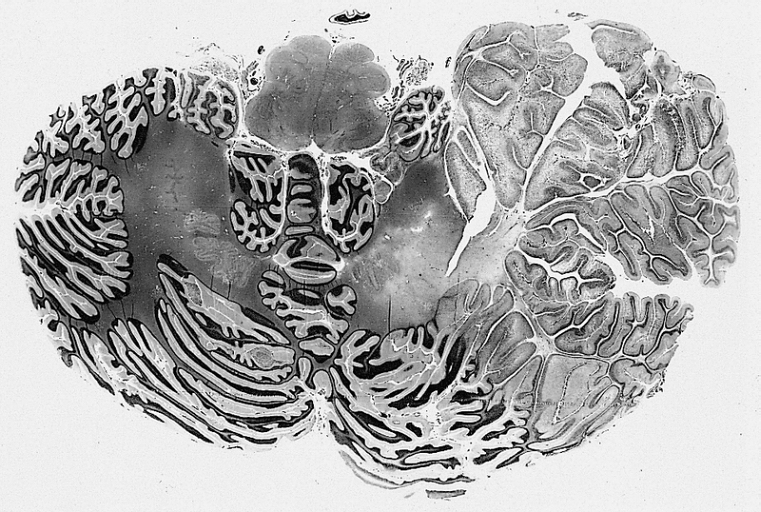
- Dysplastic cerebellar ganglioglioma (Lhermitte–Duclos disease)
- Specialty: Neuro-oncology
- Usual onset: Usually childhood to young adulthood
- Treatment: Primarily surgery
- Prognosis: >90% five-year survival rate among children

A ganglioglioma is a rare, slow-growing primary central nervous system (CNS) tumor which most frequently occurs in the temporal lobes of children and young adults. They are mixed cell tumors containing both neural ganglionic cells and neural glial cell components. This should not be confused with a gangliocytoma (ganglion cell tumor) which is composed of neurons of variable sizes but contains no glial cells.

== Classification ==
Gangliogliomas are generally benign WHO grade I tumors; the presence of anaplastic changes in the glial component is considered to represent WHO grade III (anaplastic ganglioglioma). Criteria for WHO grade II have been suggested, but are not established. Malignant transformation of spinal ganglioglioma has been seen in only a select few cases. Poor prognostic factors for adults with gangliogliomas include older age at diagnosis, male sex, and malignant histologic features.

== Histopathology ==
Histologically, ganglioglioma is composed of both neoplastic glial and ganglion cells which are disorganized, variably cellular, and non-infiltrative. Occasionally, it may be challenging to differentiate ganglion cell tumors from an infiltrating glioma with entrapped neurons. The presence of neoplastic ganglion cells forming abnormal clusters, the presence of binucleation and dysmorphic neurons are helpful clues favoring ganglioglioma over glioma. The glial component of ganglioglioma includes fibrillary astrocytes with varying degrees of cellular atypia. The neoplastic neuronal components are often clustered or irregularly oriented. Fibrovascular stroma confined to the neuronal component, perivascular lymphocytic infiltrates, and small foci of calcification are common, as is immunopositivity for synaptophysin, neuron-specific enolase, and chromogranin A. Elevated Ki-67 and p53 labeling index is associated with more aggressive tumor behavior in both children and adults with gangliogliomas. The rare occurrence of malignant transformation is confined to the glial cell population, and is characterized by increased cellularity and mitotic activity, endothelial proliferation, and necrosis.

== Diagnosis ==
Computed Tomography (CT) is generally not a recommended modality for diagnosis and evaluation of spinal cord tumors. Evaluation with Magnetic Resonance (MR) most commonly demonstrates a circumscribed solid or mixed solid and cystic mass spanning a long segment of the cord with hypointense T1 signal and hyperintense T2 signal in the solid component. Enhancement patterns are highly variable, ranging from minimal to marked, and may be solid, rim, or nodular. Adjacent cord edema and syringomyelia and peritumoral cysts may be present in addition to reactive scoliosis.

It is nearly impossible to differentiate ganglioglioma from other more common intramedullary neoplasms based on imaging alone. Astrocytoma and ependymoma are more familiar intramedullary tumors which share many similar features to ganglioglioma, including T2 hyperintensity, enhancement, tumoral cysts, and cord edema. Poorly defined margins may be more suggestive of astrocytoma, while a central location in the spinal cord, hemorrhage, and hemosiderin staining are often seen with ependymoma. Hemangioblastoma and paraganglioma are less usual intramedullary tumors, but since they are more frequently encountered than ganglioglioma, they should also be included in the differential diagnosis.

== Treatment ==
Definitive treatment for ganglioglioma requires gross total surgical resection, and a good prognosis is generally expected when this is achieved. However, indistinct tumor margins and the desire to preserve normal spinal cord tissue, motor and sensory function may preclude complete resection of tumor. According to a series by Lang et al., reviewing several patients with resected spinal cord ganglioglioma, the 5- and 10-year survival rates after total resection were 89% and 83%, respectively. In that study, patients with spinal cord ganglioglioma had a 3.5-fold higher relative risk of tumor recurrence compared to patients with supratentorial ganglioglioma. It has been recognized that postoperative results correlate closely with preoperative neurological status as well as the ability to achieve complete resection.

With the exception of WHO grade III anaplastic ganglioglioma, radiation therapy is generally regarded to have no role in the treatment of ganglioglioma. In fact, radiation therapy may induce malignant transformation of a recurrent ganglioglioma several years later. Adjuvant chemotherapy is also typically reserved for anaplastic ganglioglioma, but has been used anecdotally in partially resected low grade spinal cord gangliogliomas which show evidence of disease progression.

== See also ==
- Lhermitte-Duclos disease
