= Apudoma =

- Specialty: Oncology

In pathology, an apudoma is an endocrine tumour that arises from an APUD cell from structures such as the ampulla of Vater. They were historically thought to be derived from neural crest cells, but this has since been shown to be untrue (see neuroendocrine tumor).The term dates back to at least 1975. Because the label "apudoma" is very general, it is preferred to use a more specific term when possible.

== See also ==
- VIPoma
- Carcinoid tumor
