= Proteus-like syndrome =

- This condition is inherited in an autosomal dominant manner.
- Specialty: Medical genetics

Proteus-like syndrome (PLS) is a condition similar to Proteus syndrome, but with an uncertain cause. It's characterized by skeletal and hamartous overgrowth of multiple tissues, nevi in cerebriform connective tissue, blood vessel malformations and linear epidermal nevi.

It was featured as the first story in the 7th episode of the 10th season of Mystery Diagnosis.

== See also ==
- List of cutaneous conditions
- PTEN (gene)
- Multiple hamartoma syndrome
