= Neuroectodermal neoplasm =

Neuroectodermal tumor
- Specialty: Oncology

A neuroectodermal neoplasm is a neoplasm or tumor of the neuroectoderm. They are most commonly tumors in the central or peripheral nervous system.

Tumors exhibiting neuroectodermal differentiation are classified into two main groups:

- Group I tumors/neoplasms: neuroendocrine carcinomas. These show predominantly epithelial differentiation. They include pituitary adenoma and carcinoid tumor
- Group II tumors/neoplasms: nonepithelial neuroectodermal neoplasms. These are predominantly neural in origin. They include melanoma, olfactory neuroblastoma, and Ewing's sarcoma.
