= Follicular cyst =

Follicular Cyst may refer to:

- Dentigerous cyst
- Follicular cyst of ovary
