= Schöpf–Schulz–Passarge syndrome =

- Other names: Eyelid cysts, Palmoplantar keratoderma, Hypodontia, and Hypotrichosis
- Specialty: Medical genetics

Schöpf–Schulz–Passarge syndrome is an autosomal recessive condition with punctate symmetric palmoplantar keratoderma, with the keratoderma and fragility of the nails beginning around age 12. In addition to palmoplantar keratoderma, other symptoms include hypodontia, hypotrichosis, nail dystrophies, and eyelid cysts (apocrine hidrocystomas). Patients may also develop syringofibroadenoma and squamous cell carcinomas.

It was characterized in 1971.

It has been associated with WNT10A.

== See also ==
- Palmoplantar keratoderma
- List of cutaneous conditions
- List of dental abnormalities associated with cutaneous conditions
- List of cutaneous neoplasms associated with systemic syndromes
