= Porocarcinoma =

- Other names: malignant poroma, eccrine porocarcinoma, malignant eccrine poroma
- Specialty: Dermatology, surgery, oncology
- Symptoms: Superficial tumor of an eccrine sweat gland virtually anywhere on the skin
- Complications: Invasion of nearby tissues, recurrence after surgical removal, metastases
- Causes: Unknown
- Prognosis: Metastatic porcarcinomas often have a poor prognosis

Porocarcinoma (PCA) (also termed malignant poroma, eccrine porocarcinoma, and malignant eccrine poroma) is a rare form of skin cancer that develops in eccrine sweat glands, i.e. the body's widely distributed major type of sweat glands, as opposed to the apocrine sweat glands which are located primarily in the armpits and perineal area. This cancer typically develops in individuals as a single cutaneous tumor in the intraepidermal spiral part (termed the acrosyringium) of these sweat glands' ducts (i.e. channels) at or near to where they open on the skin's surface. PCA tumors are classified as one form of the cutaneous adnexal tumors; in a study of 2,205 cases, PCA was the most common (11.8%) form of these tumors.

Porocarcinomas are malignant counterparts to the far more common benign tumors of the eccrine sweat gland's acrosyringium, i.e. poromas. As currently viewed, there are 4 poroma variants based on their predominant cell types and extent of their tumor tissues presence in the epidermis and dermis: 1) Hidroacanthoma simplexe poromas are confined to the epidermis, i.e. uppermost layer of the skin. 2) Dermal duct poromas are confined to the dermis, i.e. layer of skin between the epidermis and subcutaneous tissues. 3) Hidradenomas have recently been sub-classified into two groups; 95% are termed clear cell hidradenomas and have features suggesting that they derive from apocrine sweat glands while the remaining 5% are termed poroid hidradenomas and have features suggesting that they derive from eccrine sweat glands. And 4) eccrine poromas are eccrine sweat gland tumors that consist of three cell types (see the histopathology section of Poromas) and are primarily located in the epidermis and superficial dermis. Poromas may have 2 or more of these variants in the same tumor tissue and the variants typically have histopathology findings that are not clearly distinguishable from each other. PCA tumors may arise from one of these longstanding poromas (in one study this occurred in 18% of cases) but more commonly appear to develop independently of any precursor poroma.

PCA are locally invasive tumors that have been treated by surgical resection but often recur at the site of their surgical removal and metastasize to distant tissues before or after their removal. Repeatedly recurrent, unresectable, and metastatic PCA have been treated with chemotherapy and/or radiotherapy. However, metastatic PCA has responded poorly to these treatments and carries a poor prognosis.

Because of their rarity and lack of distinct clinical features and variable physical and microscopic histological appearances, the diagnosis of porocarcinomas is often challenging. PCA has commonly been either mis-diagnosed or over-diagnosed. Under-diagnosis may have been responsible for a recent study conducted in a United Kingdom single center that reported that the number of PCA cases had increased 3-fold over the previous 4 years and was expected to rapidly rise further during the next decade.

== Presentation ==
In a large study reviewing all literature reports of PCA up to December 1, 2016, patients (including those with a poroma that later progressed to a PCA) presented with a single epidermal nodule or mass (71.2% of cases), ulcerated mass/nodule (18.3%), plaque (9.8%), swelling (1.3%), wart (0.6%), papule (0.6&) or nevus (i.e. mole, 0.6%). The patients were aged 6 months to 97 years old (average age 67.57 years). The lesions presented in the head & neck (39.9% of cases), legs (33.9%), arms (8.8%), back (5.1%), chest wall (4.6%), genitalia (4.0%), abdomen (2.6%), or around the anal area (0.6%) and had been present for as little as 4 days or as long as 60 years (average 5.6 years). Metastasis (most commonly involving the lymph nodes close to the primary lesion) were diagnosed at presentation in 31% of cases. Other studies report that: a) PCA tumors presented with average sizes of 2.53 cm (range of 0.3–7 cm) in largest diameter; b) PCA tumors at presentation were commonly red to violet in color, usually <2 cm in maximum diameter; and typically asymptomatic but may have been called to attention because of spontaneous bleeding, ulceration, sudden itching, pain, or rapid growth; c) in 37 cases, metastases were present in 16.2% of cases at presentation and occurred in two cases (5.4% of cases) 3 and 17 months after diagnosis; d) no metastatic disease was found at presentation or after a 3-year follow-up in 7 cases; e) PCA have metastasized to nearby or distal skin sites, local lymph nodes, or to the bones, bladder, breast, retroperitoneum, ovary, liver, lung, brain, or stomach; and f) PCA have been reported to occur in skin areas previously traumatized or exposed to radiation, excessive sunlight, or chronic lymphedema; in a sebaceous cyst; and in individuals with extramammary Paget's disease, sarcoidosis, chronic lymphocytic leukemia, pernicious anemia, Hodgkin's disease, nevus sebaceous, HIV/AIDS, xeroderma pigmentosum, immunosuppression caused by a disease or chemotherapy, pernicious anemia, and xeroderma pigmentosa.

== Histopathology ==
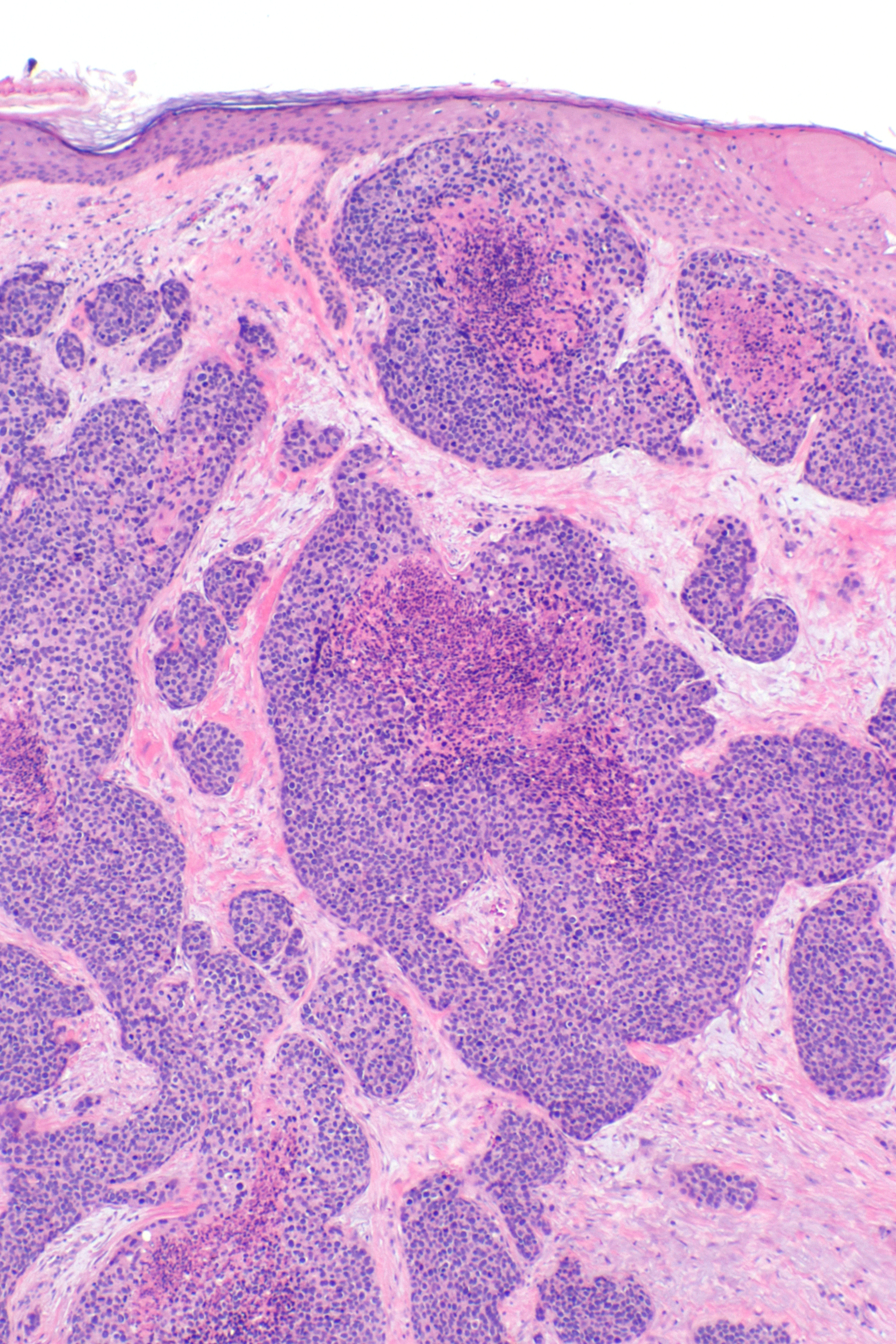
Porocarcinoma - alt -- low mag

The microscopic histopathology of benign poroma tumors stained with hematoxylin and eosin dyes consists of poroid cells (i.e. small, round cells with oval nuclei and little cytoplasm) admixed with cuticular cells (i.e. epithelium-like cells) with centrally placed nuclei and abundant eosinophilic (i.e. colored pink or red due to uptake of the eosin stain) cytoplasm. Porocarcinomas differ from poromas by their content of cells that are more irregular in size and contain misshaped nuclei that often have conspicuous nucleoli. Unlike the tumor cells in poromas, PCA tumor cells often appear to invade nearby normal tissues. are rapidly proliferating as evidenced by their increased mitotic activity, and may have differentiated (this process is termed metaplasia) to appear as squamous cells, clear cells, mucous cells, or spindle cells. PCA tissues may contain areas of necrosis (i.e. dead cells).

=== Marker proteins ===
A large review study reported that PCA tumor cells are periodic acid–Schiff stain positive (30 of 30 tested cases) and express (as detected by immunoassays) epithelial membrane antigen (51 of 51 cases), cytokeratins 1 thru 8, 10, 14 thru 16, and/or 19 as detected using the AE1/AE3 antibody cocktail which detects these but not cytokeratins 17 or 18 (22 of 22 cases), Ki-67 (6 of 6 cases), cytokeratin 7 (15 of 19 cases), TP63 (7 of 7 cases), carcinoembryonic antigen (58 of 61 cases), p53 (7 of 8 cases), and S100 (8 of 21 cases). CK20, synaptophysin, and TTF-1 were not detected in the 10, 4, and 4 cases, respectively, that were tested for these proteins. Another review study reported that PCA tumor cells express cytokeratin 19 (13 of 14 cases), the c-Kit proto-oncogene (11 of 14 cases), and epithelial cell adhesion molecule as detected by BerEp4 staining (8 of 14 cases). A study on one to a few patients reported that these tumor cells express cytokeratin 5, cytokeratin 6, keratin 7, keratin 20, Ki-67, MUC1 and Bcl-2 but not carcinoembryonic antigen, TP63, S100, CD43, or GCDFP15. Finally, a recent study on one patient reported that PCA tumor cells express epithelial membrane antigen, TP63, AE1/AE3 antibody-detected cytokeratins, carcinoembryonic antigen, and microphthalmia-associated transcription factor but not S100, cytokeratin 7, or cytokeratin 20. The presence or absence of these marker proteins is used to support the diagnosis that a skin lesion is a PCA tumor.

=== Gene abnormalities ===
A study of 11 porocarcinomas detected a YAP-NUTM1 fusion gene in the tumor cells in 6 cases while a sampling of 104 promos found this fusion gene in 21 cases; the YAP-NUTM1 fusion gene was not detected in a wide range of other skin tumor types. Other studies have found indirect evidence that this fusion gene was expressed in the PCA tissue cells of 5 of 12 and 8 of 40 PCA cases. A fusion gene is an abnormal gene consisting of parts from two different genes that are merged as a result of a large scale gene mutation such as a chromosomal translocation, interstitial deletion, or inversion. The YAP1-NUTM1 fusion gene is a translocation that merges part of the protein coding region of the NUTM1 gene located in band 14 on the long (or "q") arm of chromosome 15 with a part of the YAP1 gene located in band 22.1 on the long (i.e. "q") arm of chromosome 11 Studies on cultured immortalized human dermal keratinocyte (i.e. HDK) cells and mouse embryonic fibroblast NIH-3T3 cells found that YAP1-NUTM1 fusion genes stimulated the anchorage-independent growth of NIH-3T3 cells and activated a transcriptional enhancer factor family member (i.e. TEAD family member) reporter gene. TEAD family transcription factors (also known as transcriptional enhancer factors (TEFs) in humans include four members, TEAD1, TEAD2, TEAD3, and TEAD4 that are transcription factors, i.e. proteins that regulate the expression of various genes. TEAD transcription factors interact with transcription coregulators, including in particular the YAK1 protein, to activate various cell signaling pathways including the Hippo pathway and to regulate cellular maturation, cellular proliferation, and the development of various tissues, organs, and cancers. Cancers associated with the overexpression or overactivation of the TEAD transcription factors include those of the breasts, kidneys, stomach, liver, colon, rectum, prostate, brain (i.e. medulloblastomas), and the head and neck area (i.e. squamous cell carcinomas). It is suggested that the YAP1-NUTM1 fusion gene and the Hippo pathway which it activates may contribute to the development and progression of PCA and serve as therapeutic targets to treat YAP1-NUTM1 fusion gene bearing-PCA tumors. However, further studies are needed to confirm these suggestions. The tumor tissues of CPA have also been reported to express the YAP1-MAML2 fusion gene (1 of 11 cases), the EMC7-NUTM1 (EMC7 is the ER membrane protein complex subunit 7 gene, see endoplasmic reticulum membrane protein complex) fusion gene in a single case, and, in individual cases, mutations in the TP53, RB1, CDKN2A and HRAS tumor suppressor genes. Further studies are needed to determine if the latter fusion or mutated genes can be used as diagnostic markers or therapeutic targets for treating PCA tumors.

== Diagnosis ==
The diagnosis of PCA is based on determining that a skin lesion has one of various shapes, presentations, and microscopic histological appearances. However, its diagnosis is considered difficult. PCAs have been misdiagnosed as various disorders including poromas, squamous cell carcinomas, basal cell carcinomas, seborrheic keratosis, nevi (i.e. moles), amelanotic melanomas, superficial spreading melanomas, pyogenic granulomas, fibromas, metastatic adenocarcinomas, verruca vulgaris (i.e. warts), Paget's disease of the breast-associated skin lesions, Merkel cell carcinoma, clear cell hidradenocarcinomas, and skin metastases from other cancers. PCA lesions have histological features which help distinguish them from these other skin lesions: they typically consist of medium-sized, rapidly proliferating cells with atypical nuclei, cell junctions, and intracellular formations of duct-like structures; may have areas of tissue that are necrotic and/or contain partially formed ducts lined with cuboidal/columnar epithelial cells (this last factor is a strong indicator of PCA); and often evidence invasion of nearby tissues. In unclear cases, the expression of key marker proteins by tumor tissue cells, as detected by immunohistochemistry analyses, has been used to clarify the diagnosis. For example, lesions containing tumor cells that express cytokeratins and CK 34B12 but not prostate specific antigen or prostatic specific acid phosphatase; p16 but not retinoblastoma protein; or carcinoembryonic antigen and NUC1 but negative for periodic acid–Schiff staining have been used to support the diagnosis of PCA. Detection of the YAP1-NUTM1 fusion gene transcripts or product protein in the tumor tissue cells of a lesion may also help identify a tumor as either a PCA or poroma. Finally, the presence of metastatic disease would indicate the lesion is not a benign lesion such as a poroma, seborrheic keratosis, nevus, fibroma, or wart.

== Treatment ==
Prompt management is essential in the treatment of PCA in order to reduce the possibility of developing metastatic disease. Due to its rarity, the best treatment(s) for PCA have not been formally studied and remain unclear. Tumor excision using wide local excision margins or Mohs micrographic surgery to ensure that all malignant tissue is removed have been the most often recommended treatments for localized PCA. Removal of all tumor cells is necessary for curative therapy. Metastases are more likely to be present with PCA lesions that: a) develop spontaneous bleeding, ulceration, sudden itching, pain, or rapid growth; b) are accompanied by enlarged sentinel lymph nodes, i.e. lymph nodes draining the tumor site; c) consist of poorly differentiated cells as detected on biopsy; d) penetrate 7 mm or more into the skin; e) contain rapidly proliferating cells as defined by the presence of 14 or more cells undergoing mitoses per high power microscopic field; or f) occur in the perineum, trunk, or lower limb. In these cases, studies recommend that patients be more fully examined for metastases before surgery using lymphadenectomy (i.e. lymph node dissection) in order to check for metastasis in, and remove, lymph nodes draining the site of the skin tumor and by magnetic resonance, positron emission tomography–computed tomography, X-ray, ultrasound imaging methods to detect metastases. PCA cases in which surgical resection of the primary tumor does not remove all malignant cells or the tumor recurs at its site of removal (≈20% recur at the primary site within a year of excision) have been treated with repeated resections and/or local radiation therapy. Adjuvant radiation therapy may also be useful to treat localized APC tumors that are at high-risk of metastasizing such as tumors that are >5 cm in maximal diameter, have invaded lymphatic vessels, or contain poorly differentiated cells.

Patients that failed to have their disease completely removed with surgical/radiation/lymphadenectomy procedures or have surgically inaccessible metastases are usually treated with various drug regimens. These regimens have included 5-fluorouracil (i.e. 5-FU) alone, 5-FU & cisplatin, 5-FU & Adriamycin & paclitaxel, docetaxel & carboplatin, paclitaxel & carboplatin & intralesional (i.e. injected directly into the lesion) interleukin 2, topical diphenylcyclopropenone (a drug which is primarily used to treat warts), intralesional interleukin 2 alone, interferon alfa & isotretinoin, topical 5-FU, intra-arterial (i.e. injection of a drug into a small artery that supplies blood to a tumor) docetaxel, or the immunotherapy drug, pembrolizumab. The two patients treated with pembrolizumab obtained a complete and excellent responses that continued at follow-up examinations done respectively 24 and 18 months after treatment. In general, however, there has been no highly and repeatedly successful drug treatments specified for metastatic PCA: the cited drug treatment regimens have been used in too few cases to be properly evaluated and in general produced no, minimal, or only very short-term benefits.

== Prognosis ==
Although most studies have observed patients for short periods and do not mention survival times, survival rates, or definitive prognoses, some studies have reported that localize PCA may be successfully treated by surgical removal. However, PCA has often been reported to be a very aggressive malignancy that is a) that is found to be metastatic at diagnosis in approximately 20% to 30% of patients; b) recurs after surgical removal in another ≈20% of cases; and c) carries a poor prognosis with survival times that are often just a few months after diagnosis regardless of management. However, a recent study of eight PCA cases found no nodal positivity, recurrence, or death after follow-ups. Further studies are need to define the prognosis of PCA.

== See also ==
- Poroma
- Microcystic adnexal carcinoma
