= Rasmussen syndrome (dermatology) =

- Specialty: Dermatology/oncology

Rasmussen syndrome is a condition characterized by multiple skin growths called trichoepitheliomas.

== See also ==
- List of cutaneous neoplasms associated with systemic syndromes
- List of cutaneous conditions
