= Bazex syndrome =

Bazex syndrome may refer to:

- Bazex–Dupré–Christol syndrome
- Acrokeratosis paraneoplastica of Bazex
