= AE3 =

AE3 may refer to:

- A size designation for Constantinian bronze coins
- AE1/AE3 antibody cocktail used in immunohistochemistry
- Aero Ae 04, a Czechoslovak aircraft
