= Giant solitary trichoepithelioma =

- Specialty: Dermatology, oncology

Giant solitary trichoepithelioma is a cutaneous condition characterized by a skin lesion that may be up to several centimetres in diameter.

== Signs and symptoms ==
Giant solitary trichoepithelioma primarily affects the perianal and groin region. They typically measure a few centimeters in diameter and rarely reach 2 to 3 cm.

== Diagnosis ==
Giant solitary trichoepithelioma is distinguished histologically by a dermal or subcutaneous tumor made up of basophilic cells grouped in solid, adenoid, or lace-like clusters. The cells have a sparse cytoplasm and a darkly pigmented nucleus, and the tumor islands exhibit the typical peripheral cell palisading. Papillary bodies and trichilemmal keratinization in horn cysts are indicative of a solid diagnosis, however they are not always present. Failures to develop papillary mesenchyme are represented by papillary bodies.

== Treatment ==
The preferred course of treatment is either radiosurgical ablation or surgical excision, with or without a flap.

== See also ==
- Trichoepithelioma
- Skin lesion
