= Side effects of radiotherapy on fertility =

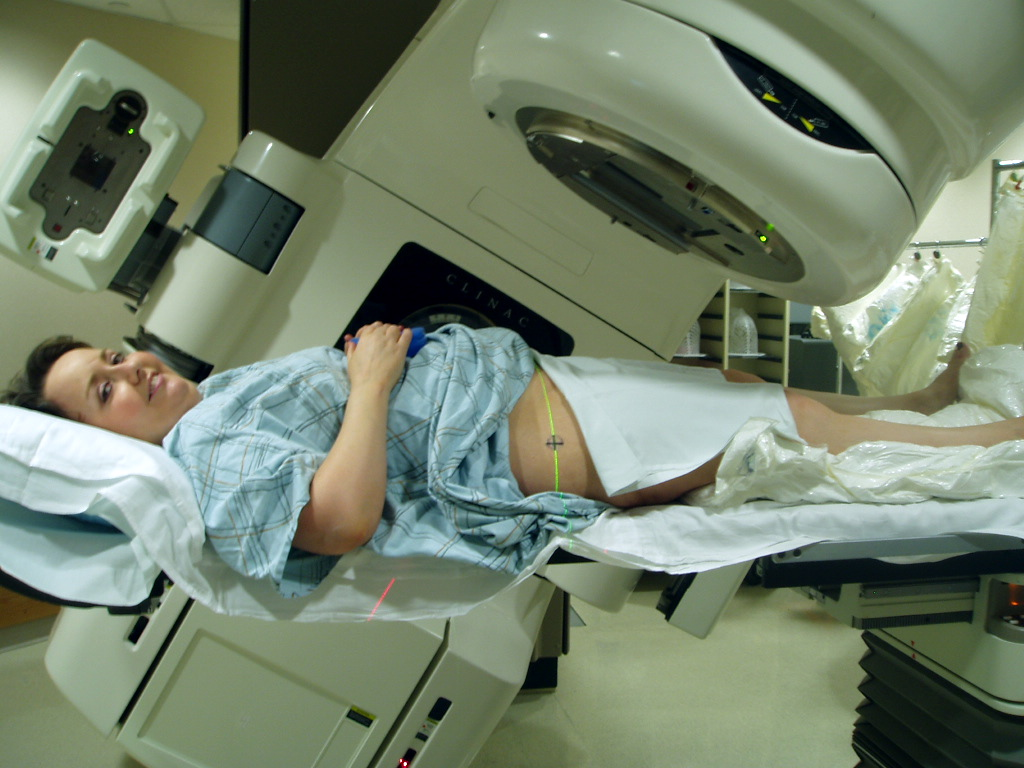
Patient undergoing pelvic radiotherapy

The side effects of radiotherapy on fertility are a growing concern to patients undergoing radiotherapy as cancer treatments. Radiotherapy is essential for certain cancer treatments and often is the first point of call for patients. Radiation can be divided into two categories: ionising radiation (IR) and non-ionising radiation (NIR). IR is more dangerous than NIR and a source of this radiation is X-rays used in medical procedures, for example in radiotherapy.

IR can have varying impacts which depend on many factors including age, irradiation field and treatment dose and duration. Where the radiotherapy is directed is important as IR to the pelvis will affect the ovary and uterus or testis. Whereas cranial irradiation will disrupt the hypothalamic-pituitary-gonadal axis (HPG-A), causing subsequent disruption of hormone secretion.

In females, IR can have long-term effects on fertility, specifically on ovarian insufficiency, pubertal arrest and subsequent infertility.

In males, the use of radiotherapy can disrupt the endocrine system leading to altered spermatogenesis and consequently a decrease in sperm count, sperm motility, sperm morphology and sperm viability.

The rapid evolution of radiotherapy technologies has had the benefit of more effective and accurate treatments with less side effects.

== Impacts of radiotherapy on female fertility ==
Radiation therapy can have a significant impact on female fertility. The damage induced varies greatly and is determined by factors such as the age of the patient along with the dose and duration of treatment given. Estimates suggest that less than 2Gy of radiation could destroy half of a female’s immature oocytes. Female ovaries are estimated to store over 1,000,000 primordial follicles at birth which decrease in number and quality with increasing age via processes such as apoptosis. Radiation therapy greatly accelerates this decline. Permanent damage occurs with follicular atrophy and reduced follicle numbers. Consequently these changes lead to uterine dysfunction due to changes in ovarian hormone production which can result in early menopause and risk of infertility.

Hormonal disruption includes female patients experiencing decrease LH (luteinising hormone) secretion and attenuated LH surges leading to increased risk of ovarian failure. LH plays an important role in proper sexual development. Further potential endocrinopathies include hypogonadism and hyperprolactinemia. Studies now suggest that the stage of follicular development may determine how much damage is induced.

Radiation therapy has been seen to also have a direct impact on the uterus, leading to changes to its vascular supply, volume and elasticity. Necrosis, atrophy and fibrosis have also all been observed in the endometrium and myometrium. Changes such as these have significant consequences in regard to pregnancy outcomes; studies suggest cancer patients receiving radiation have a higher chance of experiencing miscarriages or having low birth weight, premature children. The likelihood of perinatal infant mortality and low birth weight are significantly related to radiation dose.

== Impacts of radiotherapy on male fertility ==
Male fertility can be greatly impacted by radiotherapy of the reproductive system. Spermatogenesis is a process by which male sperm cells are produced. This process can take up to 70 days to complete. Some of the cells involved in this process can be damaged by the use of radiotherapy. Cells called spermatogonia are the most heavily impacted by radiotherapy. These are the cells that go on to divide to produce spermatozoa, or what are commonly known as sperm cells. Spermatogonia are the most impacted by radiotherapy because they are more radiosensitive than other types of cells such as spermatozoa. This means that the whole spermatogenic process is impacted by radiotherapy.

In addition to the damage of spermatogonia, the cells which produce a hormone called testosterone are also impaired by radiotherapy. Testosterone is the main male hormone in the body. These cells are called Leydig cells and they are found in the testes. However, Leydig cells are far more resistant to radiation than other cells in the testes and only become damaged by high levels of radiotherapy. These cells are more sensitive when the radiotherapy takes place in childhood. Damaged Leydig cells reduce the levels of testosterone in the body, which in turn increases the levels of another hormone called LH. Clinically, the monitoring of these two hormones can be indicative of Leydig cell function and health.

In combination, these two processes can lead to male fertility being compromised and can sometimes result in infertility.

== Long-term effects of childhood radiotherapy on fertility ==
The number of childhood cancer survivors is increasing due to technological and diagnostic advancements. However as a result, there is increasing concern of the long-term effects of cancer treatments, such as radiotherapy treatment. A significant issue associated with childhood radiotherapy includes infertility.

Prepubescent males who experience radiotherapy to their testes, can result in reduced spermatogenesis. This can be through damage to the germ cells, the sertoli cells and/or Leydig cells. Both the dosage and the timing of the treatment can determine the extent of disruption to spermatogenesis. In prepubescent males, low doses (>1-3Gy) can cause short-term oligospermia or azoospermia, while higher doses (>2-3 Gy) can cause permanent azoospermia.

Moreover, testicular radiation or central nervous system (CNS) radiation in prepubertal males can affect testosterone levels and cause hypoandrogenism. Testicular radiation damages the androgen-producing Leydig cells while CNS radiation impairs the hypothalamic-pituitary-gonadal (HPG) axis, reducing gonadotropin production.

In prepubescent females, high radiation dose to the pelvic region can also have adverse side effects on fertility. Long-term effects include early onset menopause, ovarian failure and inability to complete puberty. Where pregnancy occurs in these individuals, there are high risks associated with the health of the offspring due to pregnancy complications. These include low birth weight, miscarriage and premature labour.

== Prevention and treatment of infertility caused by radiotherapy ==
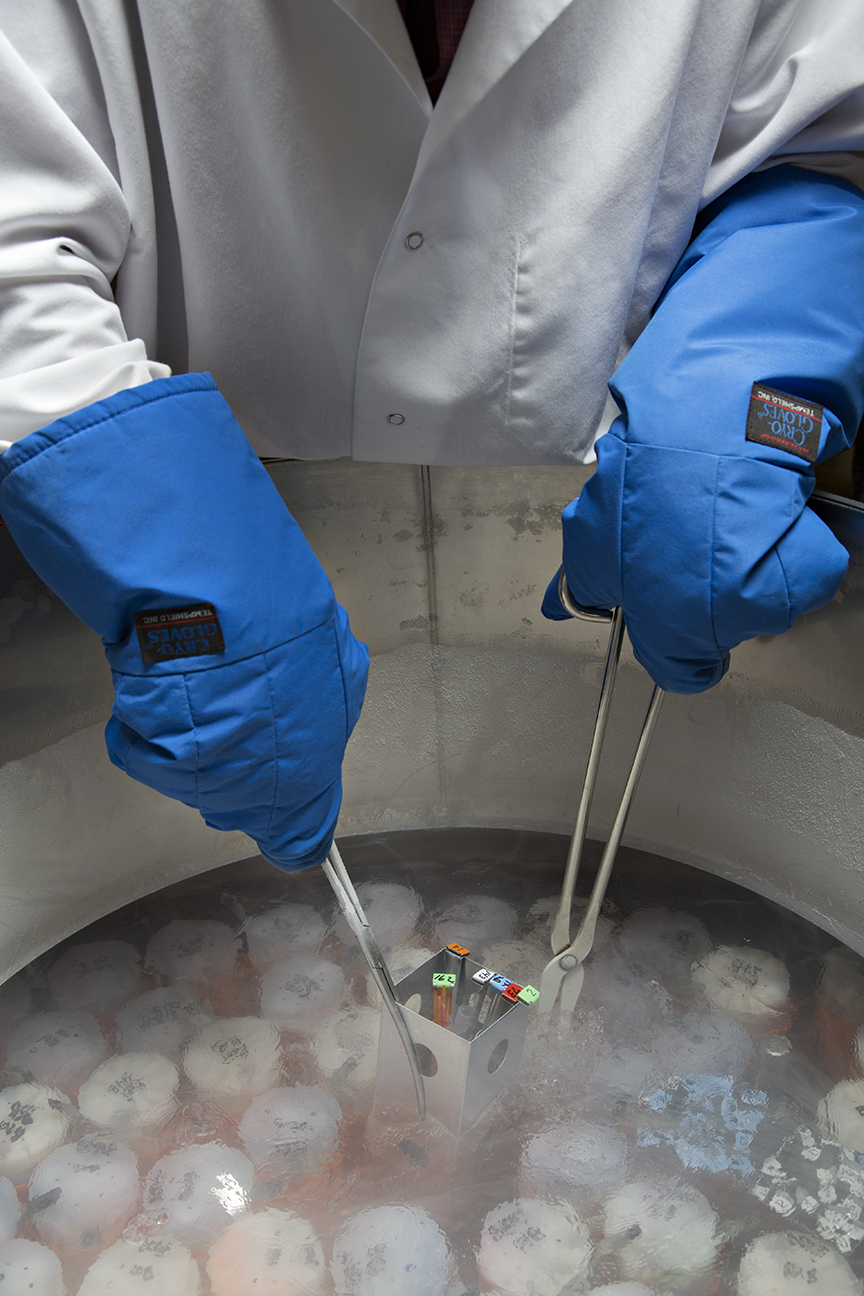
Cryopreservation of gametes

In modern medicine there are multiple options to limit the effect of cancer treatment on fertility. One of the preventative measures in females is transposition of gonadal organs further from local therapeutic agents with a success rate over 90%. Another less invasive method used for many years is lead shielding of gonadal region in both males and females as a protective measure against radiotherapy.

In prepubescent males novel techniques such as testicular tissue extraction and cryopreservation as well as in vitro maturation of spermatogonia which can then be transferred to native tissue after the treatment are being heavily researched. The most common solution is cryopreservation of sperms in post pubertal males and cryopreservation of oocytes or embryos for females with smaller age constrain compared to males who can then utilise multiple assisted reproductive techniques (ART) methods such as intrauterine insemination, IVF or ICSI as an alternative resource for preservation of fertility.

Future approach to this problem focuses on cytoprotective strategies using hormonal treatment to alter HPG-A to guard reproductive organs from radiotherapy. By disrupting the gametogenesis or decreasing the sensitivity of germ cells scientists could acquire quiescent state less susceptible to side effects of cancer treatment.
