= Brooke–Fordyce syndrome =

- Specialty: Dermatology/oncology

Brooke–Fordyce syndrome is a condition characterized by multiple trichoepitheliomas.

== See also ==
- List of cutaneous neoplasms associated with systemic syndromes
- List of cutaneous conditions
