= Generalized trichoepithelioma =

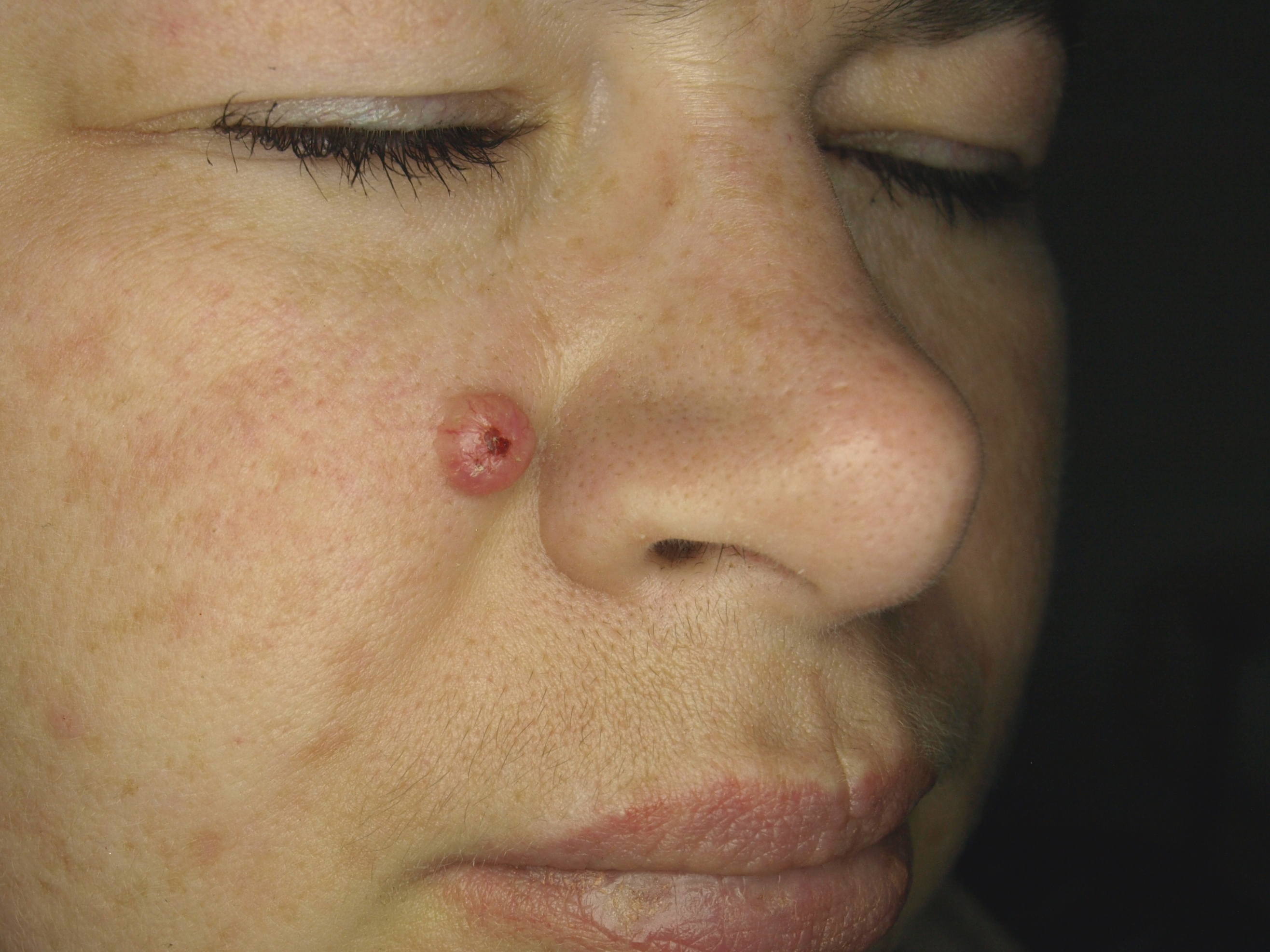
- Trichoepithelioma in 39-year-old woman.
- Specialty: Dermatology

Generalized trichoepitheliomas are characterized histologically by replacement of the hair follicles by trichoepithelioma-like epithelial proliferations associated with hyperplastic sebaceous glands.

== See also ==
- Skin lesion
- List of cutaneous conditions
