= Acrospiroma =

- Other names: Hidradenoma
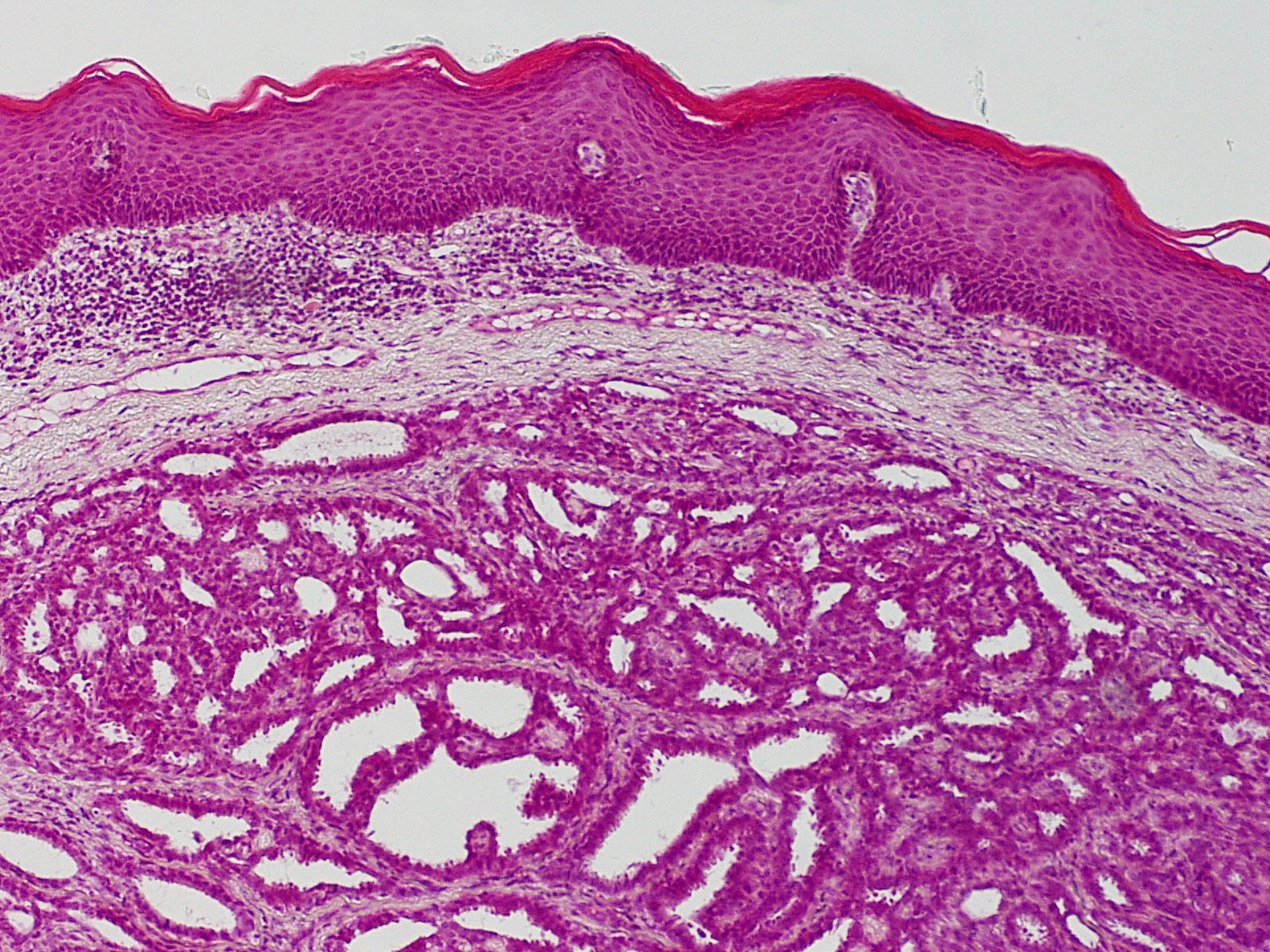
- Tubular hidradenoma, apocrine
- Specialty: Dermatology

Acrospiromas are a broad class of benign cutaneous adnexal tumors. Cutaneous adnexal tumors are a group of skin tumors consisting of tissues that have differentiated (i.e. matured from stem cells) towards one or more of the four primary adnexal structures found in normal skin: hair follicles, sebaceous sweat glands, apocrine sweat glands, and eccrine sweat glands. Acrospiromas are thought to derive from apocrine or eccrine sweat gland ducts near their acrosyringium, i.e. point where these ducts open to the skin's surface.

The acrospiroma group of tumors consists of: 1) the hidradenomas, including their eccrine acrospiroma, clear cell hidradenoma (also termed clear cell acrospiroma), nodular hidradenoma (also termed nodular acrospiroma, clear cell myoepithelioma, and eccrine sweat gland adenoma of the clear cell type), and solid-cystic hidradenoma variants; 2) the myoepitheliomas; and 3) the poromas, particularly their dermal duct tumor (also termed dermal duct poroma) and hidroacanthoma simplex variants. However, the literature on the acrospiromas is confusing and often terms their variants with different and interchangeable names.

Acrospiromas, while by definition benign skin tumors, may recur at the sites of their surgical removal and, uncommonly, progress to malignant tumors such as the malignant hidradenomas, i.e. hidradenocarcinomas, malignant myoepitheliomas, and malignant poromas, i.e. porocarcinomas. Further information on the acrospiromas, malignant acrospiromas, and their variants are in the linkages to them in this article.

== Additional images ==
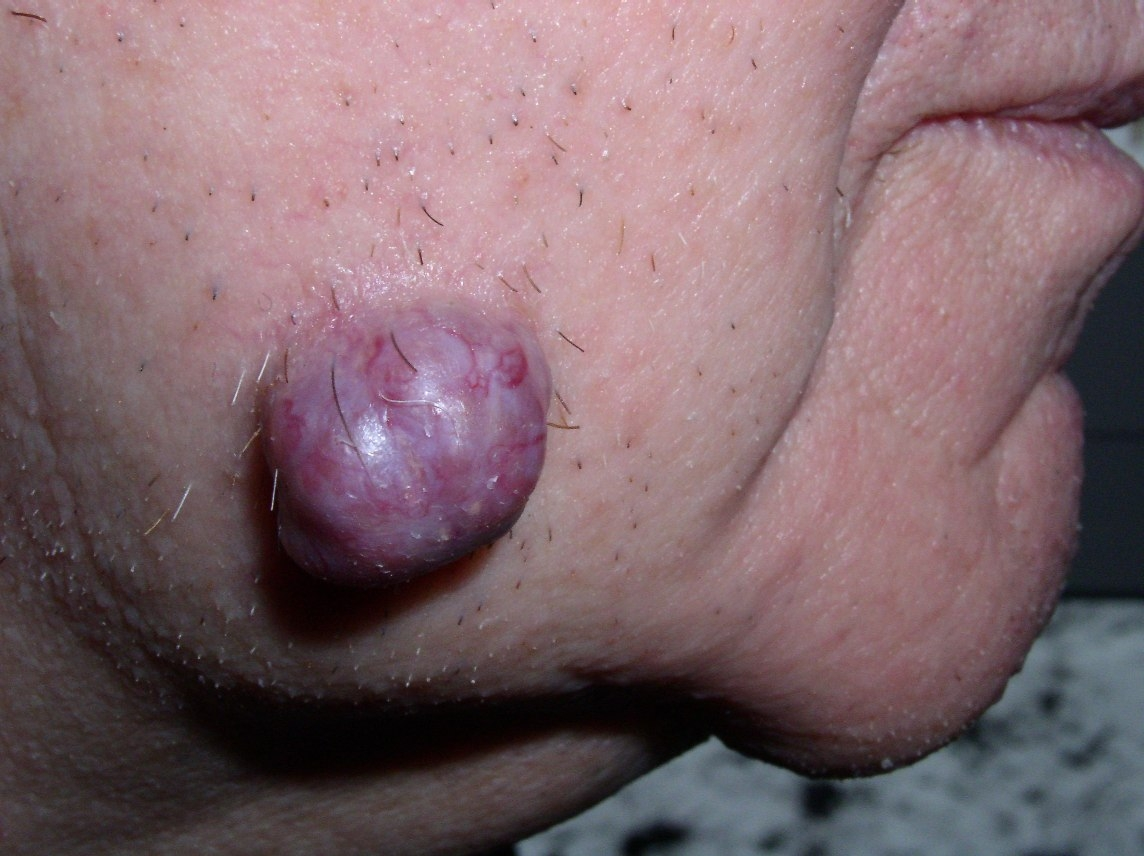
A hidradenoma, here a benign neoplasm of the sweat glands of the cheek. It is not solid but is fluid-filled.

== See also ==
- Hidradenocarcinoma
- List of cutaneous conditions
