= Poroma =

Benign cutaneous tumor

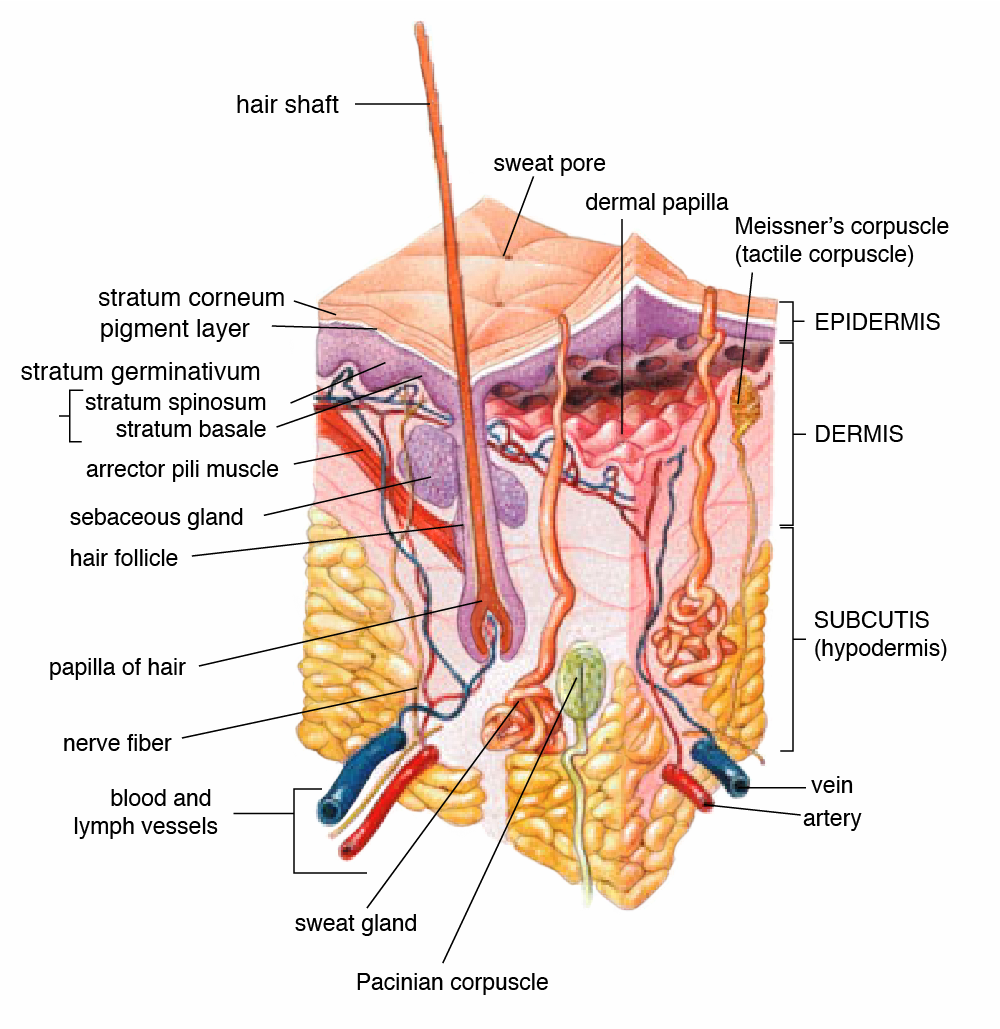
Poromas are benign tumors of the distal portion of sweat gland ducts.

Poromas are rare, benign, cutaneous adnexal tumors. Cutaneous adnexal tumors are a group of skin tumors consisting of tissues that have differentiated (i.e. matured from stem cells) towards one or more of the four primary adnexal structures found in normal skin: hair follicles, sebaceous sweat glands, apocrine sweat glands, and eccrine sweat glands. Poromas are eccrine or apocrine sweat gland tumors derived from the cells in the terminal portion of these glands' ducts. This part of the sweat gland duct is termed the acrosyringium and had led to grouping poromas in the acrospiroma class of skin tumors (syringofibroadenomas and syringoacanthomas are classified as acrospiromas). Here, poromas are regarded as distinct sweat gland tumors that differ from other sweat gland tumors by their characteristic clinical presentations, microscopic histopathology, and the genetic mutations that their neoplastic cells have recently been found to carry.

As currently viewed, there are 4 poroma variants based on their predominant cell types and extent of their tumor tissues presence in the epidermis and dermis: 1) Hidroacanthoma simplex poromas are confined to the epidermis, i.e. uppermost layer of the skin. 2) Dermal duct poromas are confined to the dermis, i.e. layer of skin between the epidermis and subcutaneous tissues. 3) Hidradenomas have recently been sub-classified into two groups; 95% are termed clear cell hidradenomas and have features suggesting that they derive from apocrine sweat glands while the remaining 5% are termed poroid hidradenomas and have features suggesting that they derive from eccrine sweat glands. And 4) eccrine poromas are eccrine sweat gland tumors that consist of three cell types (see Histopathology section).

Poromas usually occur as single, small, skin tumors that develop in middle aged to elderly individuals. They may occur anywhere on the body, but are most commonly seen on the head, neck, and extremities. They seldom cause symptoms. While benign, long-standing poromas have, in very rare cases, progressed to malignant forms termed porocarcinomas. Poromas are treated by excision; their removal is almost always curative.

== Presentation ==
Poromas are rare tumors that in two large review studies represented 0.0058% and 0.134% of all skin tumors; dermal duct tumors are the rarest form of the poromas, representing only 3.3% of these tumors in 3 studies examining 675 poroid neoplasms. They usually occur in the elderly population (mean age 65.1–66.6 in different studies) as small (<2 centimeters), solitary dome-shaped papules, plaques, or nodules, that are skin-colored, pink, red, white, or blue and range from smooth to wart-like, ulcerative, or pyogenic granuloma-like lesions. They may be located on the palms of the hands, soles of the feet, trunk, face, neck, or other cutaneous surfaces such as the areola, nipple, or other areas of the breast, on the scrotum, or on the vulva. Rarely, individuals present with multiple poromas either in one or widespread areas; these cases are termed poromatosis.

Poromas present more commonly in: pregnancy; patients treated with electron therapy for mycosis fungoides; sites of chronic radiation dermatitis caused by long-term radiation exposure; patients who received chemotherapy with or with radiation therapy (these patients have often presented with poromatosis); individuals with underlying skin conditions such as hypohidrotic ectodermal dysplasia and Bowen's disease (i.e. a form of squamous cell carcinoma that is localized to the outermost layer of the skin); and skin plaques of individuals with the congenital disease, nevus sebaceous.

Poromas are usually slow growing and asymptomatic but some individuals report that their lesions are itchy, mildly tender, or painful. An existing poroma that develops spontaneous bleeding, ulceration, sudden itching, pain, or rapid growth over a short period of time may indicate that it has become a cancerous porocarcinoma. These cancers may metastasize to local lymph nodes, nearby or distal skin sites, bones, bladder, breast, retroperitoneum, ovary, liver, lung, brain, or stomach. However, the progression of a poroma to a porocarcinoma is very rare, i.e. less than 1% of cases.

== Histopathology ==
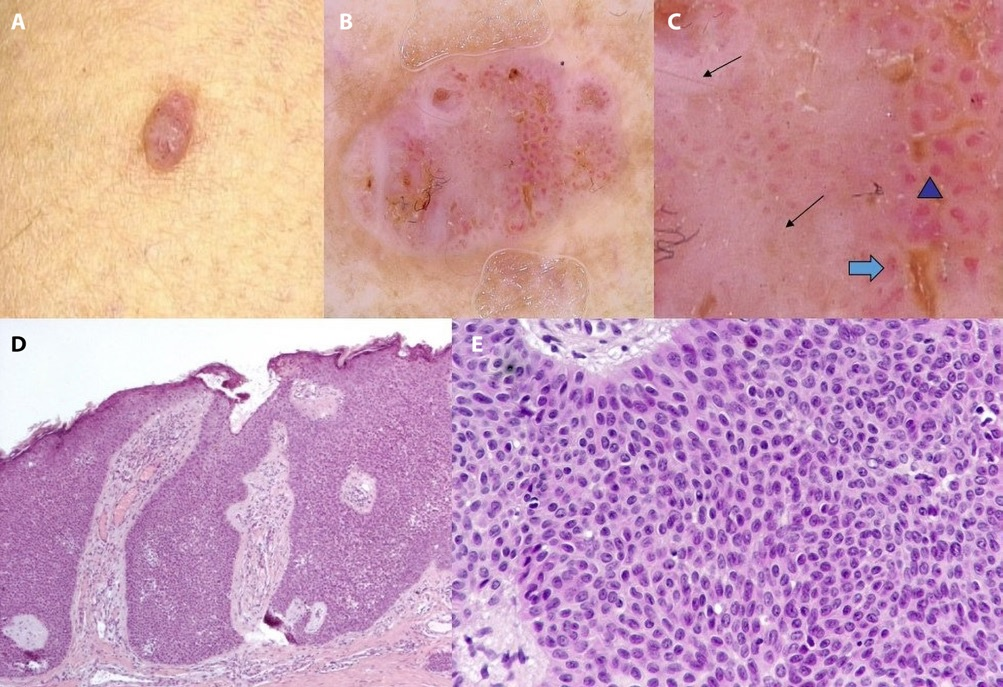
Dermoscopy and histopathology of eccrine poroma: (A) Clinical presentation of a nonpigmented eccrine poroma sensu stricto as a pink nodule located on the foot (B,C) Dermoscopy shows milky red areas (light blue arrow), milky red globules (dark blue triangle), and dotted vessels (black arrow) (original magnifications ×20 and ×40, respectively). (D,E) Histopathologically, the neoplasm consists of poroid and cuticular cells and tubular structures that are continuous with the epidermis (H&E stain, original magnifications ×10 and ×40, respectively).

Microscopic histopathological examinations of the tumor tissues of all poroma variants stained with hematoxylin and eosin dyes reveal: a) basophilic "poroid cells" (i.e. small, cuboid-shaped cells with oval nuclei which resemble cells in the peripheral layer of the distal portion of eccrine sweat gland ducts) that may form cords and broad columns extending downward from the epidermis; b) larger cuticular cells (i.e. squamous epithelial-like eosinophilic cells that resemble the luminal cells lining eccrine sweat gland ducts); and in some cases c) clear cells (i.e. cells with small nuclei surrounded by pale cytoplasm). Poroma tumor tissues may appear highly vascularized and/or have areas of necrosis, i.e. dead or dying cells. Hidroacanthoma simplex variants are mainly composed of poroid cells, few cuticular cells, and no clear cells and are confined to the epidermis; dermal ductal variants are mostly confined to the superficial dermis and are composed of small solid and cystic nodular aggregates of poroid, cuticular, and clear cells; poroid hidradenoma variants have large aggregates of solid and cystic components and extend deeper into the dermis or even subcutis; and eccrine poroma variants are composed of all three cell types but are primarily located in the epidermis and superficial dermis. Poromas may have 2 or more of these variants in the same tumor tissue and the variants typically have histopathology findings that are not clearly distinguishable from each other.

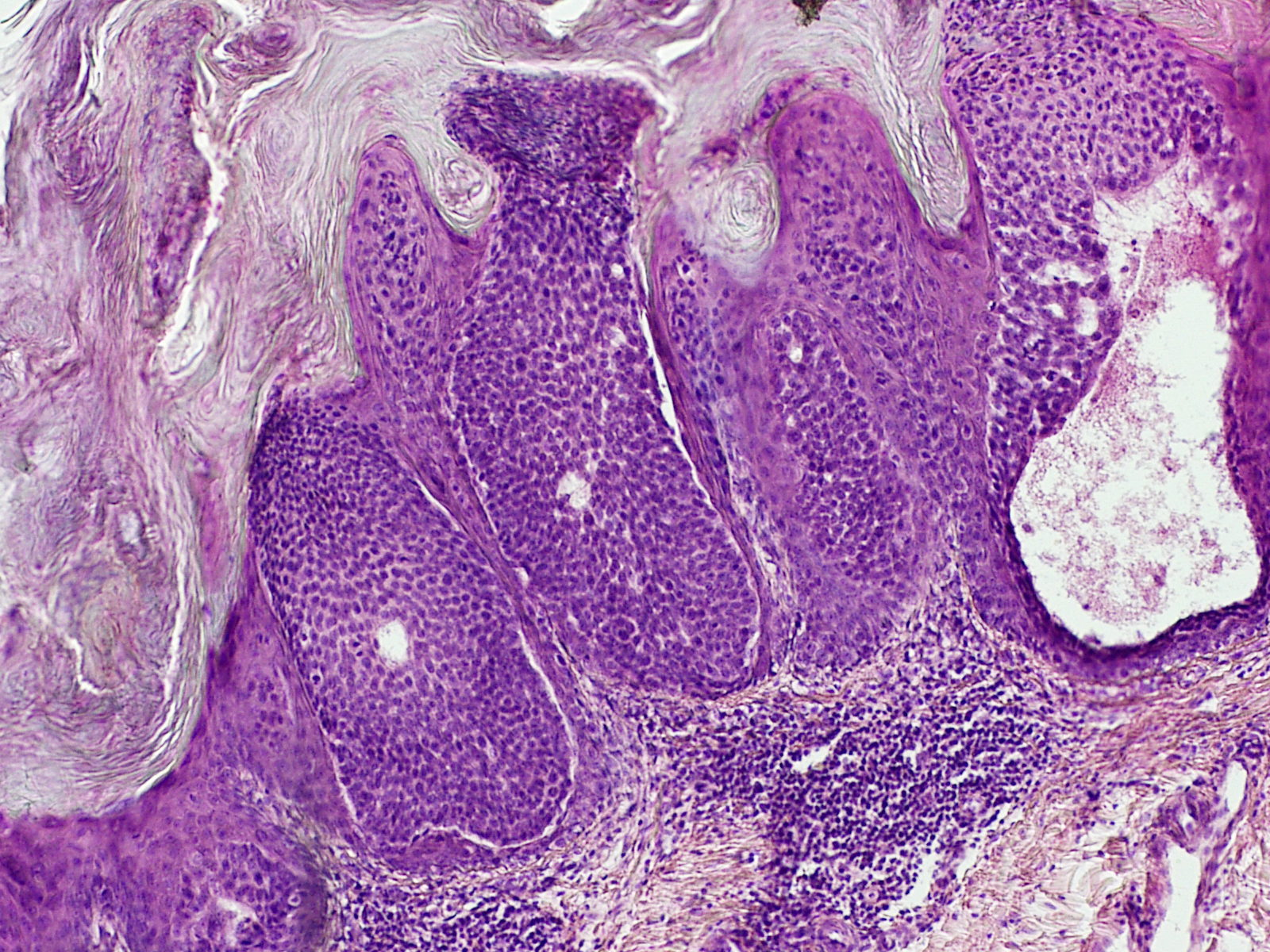
Hidroacanthoma simplex

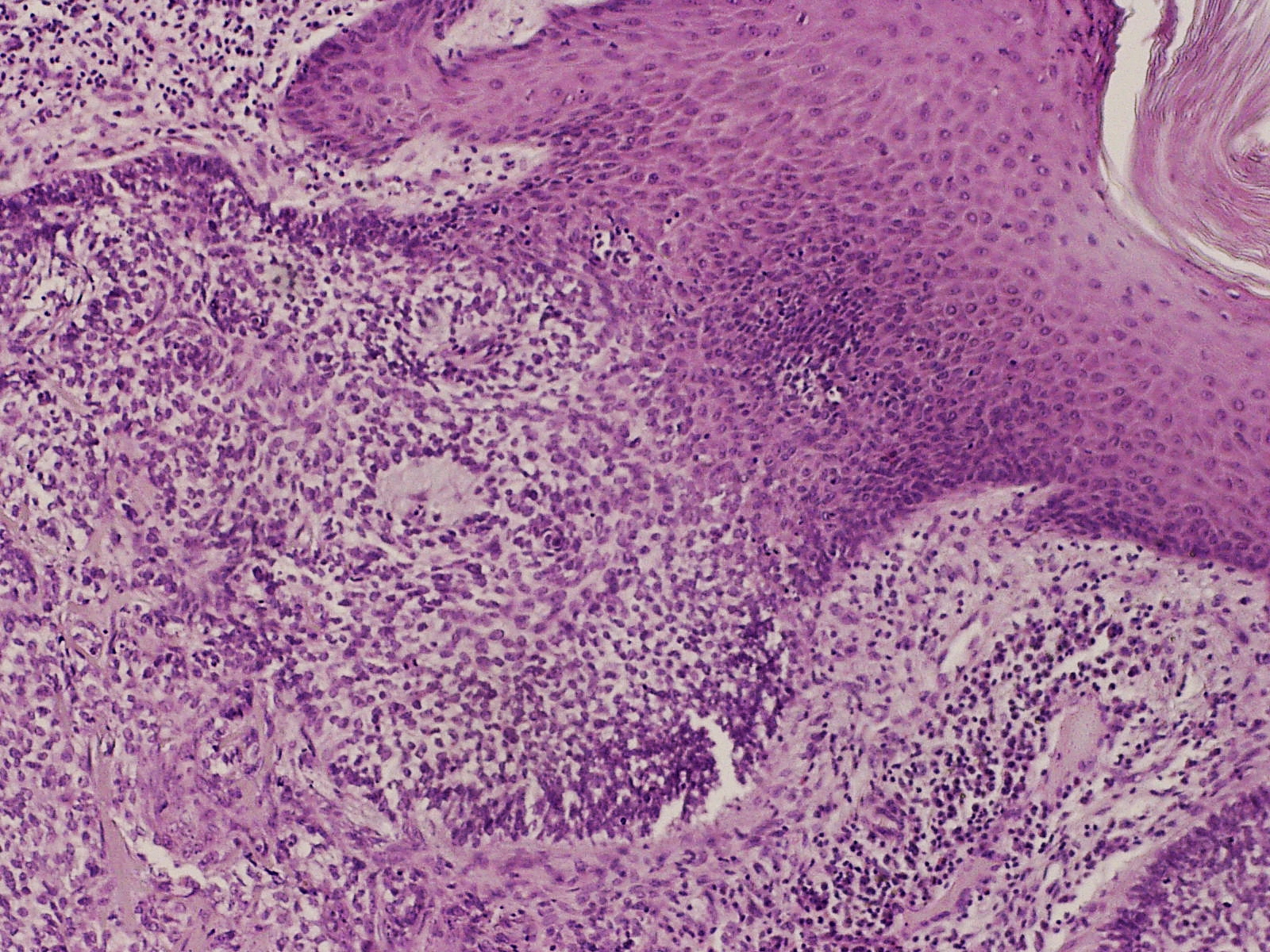
Eccrine poroma

=== Immunohistochemistry ===
As detected by immunohistochemical analyses, the poroma tumor cells, regardless of variant type, test positive when probed with the AE1/AE3 antibody cocktail that detects various cytokeratin proteins. Tumor cells of the four variants also commonly express carcinoembryonic antigen (i.e. CEA) or MUC1 (also termed EMA) and, except for the hidroacanthoma simplex variant, the carcinoembryonic antigen and MUC1 protein.

=== Gene abnormalities ===
The four poroma variants contain at least one of two YAP1 fusion genes, i.e. abnormal genes caused by a mutation which merges a part of the YAP1 gene fused to part of either the Nuclear protein in testis gene (also termed the NUTM1 gene) or the MAML2 gene to form the YAP1::NUTM1 and YAP::MAML2 fusion genes, respectively. Rarely, they may also contain a WWTR1::NUTM1 fusion gene. The YAP1::MAML2 fusion gene is detected in ~63% of poromas, the YAP1::NUTM1 fusion in 20.2% to 66% of poromas, and the WWTR1::NUTM1 fusion gene in 1% of poromas. YAP1 and WNTR1 fusion genes have been implicated in the initiation, aggressiveness, metastasis, and/or therapy resistance of various neoplasms. Studies are needed to determine if they play a role in the development and/or progression of poromas.

== Diagnosis ==
The great diversity, rarity, and complex terminology of poromas make their diagnosis challenging. They have been misdiagnosed as other types of skin tumors including porocarcinomas, basal cell carcinomas, pyogenic granulomas, skin tags, plantar warts (i.e. warts on the palms or soles), fibromas, hemangiomas, pigmented moles, seborrheic keratosis, trichilemmomas, melanomas, Kaposi sarcomas, and other adnexal tumors. Poromas are typically diagnosed based on their clinical presentation; microscopic histopathology showing tumor tissues consisting of poroid, cuticular, and/or clear cells; and, in unclear cases, the presence of tumor cells that express a YAP1::NUTM1, YAP::MAML2, and/or WWTR1::NUTM1 fusion gene. However, these fusion genes also occur in porocarcinomas and cannot be used to differentiate poromas from their malignant counterpart. Poromas and porocarcinomas are distinguished based on their clinical findings and histopathology, e.g. a higher Ki-67 labeling index and aberrant expression of p53, RB, and p16 proteins are more frequent in porocarcinoma (see Diagnosis of porcarcinomas). Dermatoscopy, particularly when revealing a "leaf- and flower-like pattern" in a skin tumor, has been used as a strong indicator that the lesion is a poroma, but confirmation of this diagnosis ultimately relies on histopathological analyses.

There is no clear-cut evidence that diagnosing a poroma's variant type carries any clinical or therapeutic significance.

=== Treatment ===
Superficial poroma tumors have been treated by shaving (i.e. removal using a sharp razor) or electrosurgical destruction. Deeper lesions have been removed by excisional biopsy (i.e. a procedure in which an entire tumorous or suspicious area is removed) or simple surgical excision. Since poromas are almost always benign tumors and rarely recur after their removal, these treatments are in general curative.

== See also ==
- Porocarcinoma
- Hidradenoma
