= Syringoma =

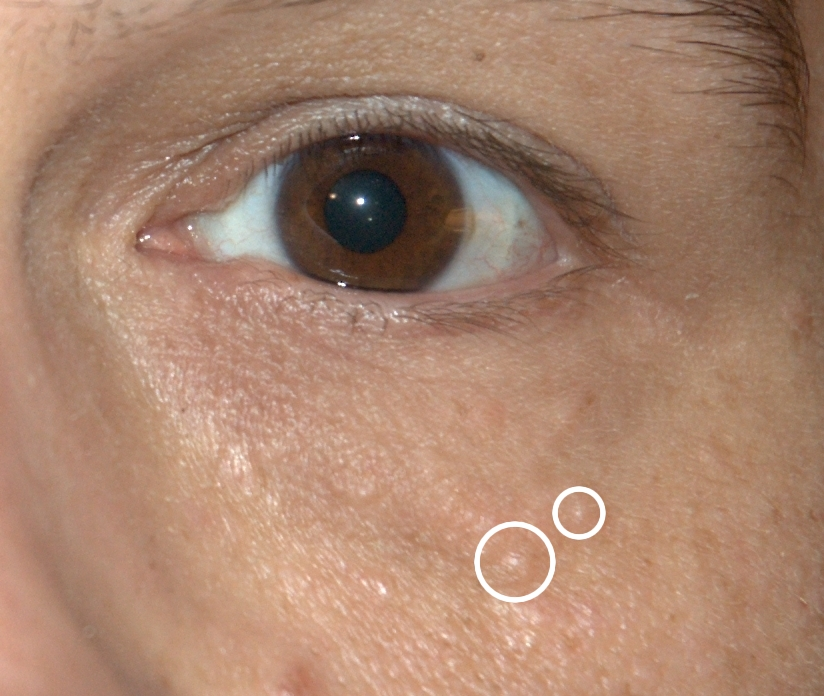
- Syringomas highlighted by white circles
- Specialty: Oncology

Syringomas are benign eccrine sweat duct tumors, typically found clustered on eyelids, although they may also be found in the armpits, abdomen, chest, neck, scalp, or groin area, including genitals, in a symmetric pattern. They are skin-colored or yellowish firm, rounded bumps, 1–3 mm in diameter, and may be confused with xanthoma, milia, hidrocystoma, trichoepithelioma, and xanthelasma. They are more common in women and are most commonly found in middle-aged Asian women. While they can present at any time in life, they typically present during adolescence. They are usually not associated with any other symptoms, although can sometimes cause itchiness or irritation.

== Types ==
- The eruptive form typically presents on the anterior chest, abdomen, neck, and arms. It presents in successive crops with periods of relief in between times of active rash.
- The milia-like type of syringoma is typically smaller lesions that have a milky white center that can look like milia.
- The plaque type is more commonly associated with itchiness and chronic scratching that leads to epidermal thickening similar to lichen planus.
- The familial form, in some cases of syringoma, exhibits a familial pattern in an autosomal-dominant pattern of inheritance. Chromosome 16q22 has been shown to be involved in the genetic links of syringoma.

== Presentation ==
=== Associated syndromes ===
Syringomas can be found in association with other symptoms as part of a syndrome. Hailey–Hailey disease (also known as familial benign chronic pemphigus) is a blistering disease that can also include syringomas.

Several systemic syndromes have also been associated with syringoma including diabetes mellitus, Down syndrome, Brooke–Spiegler syndrome, and Nicolau–Balus syndrome. Specifically, diabetes mellitus is strongly associated with clear cell syringoma consisting of nests of clear cells containing glycogen. A phosphorylase deficiency, resulting from elevated glucose levels seen in diabetes, is thought to lead to an accumulation of glycogen in the skin and within the clear cells. The incidence of syringomas has been reported in up to 40% of people with Down syndrome, and can be associated with a condition calcinosis cutis, which requires prompt medical attention. Brooke–Spiegler syndrome is a rare autosomal-dominant syndrome with cutaneous manifestations including syringomas and trichoepitheliomas. Nicolau–Balus syndrome is a rare autosomal-dominant disorder consisting of atrophoderma vermiculata and syringomas.

== Pathophysiology ==
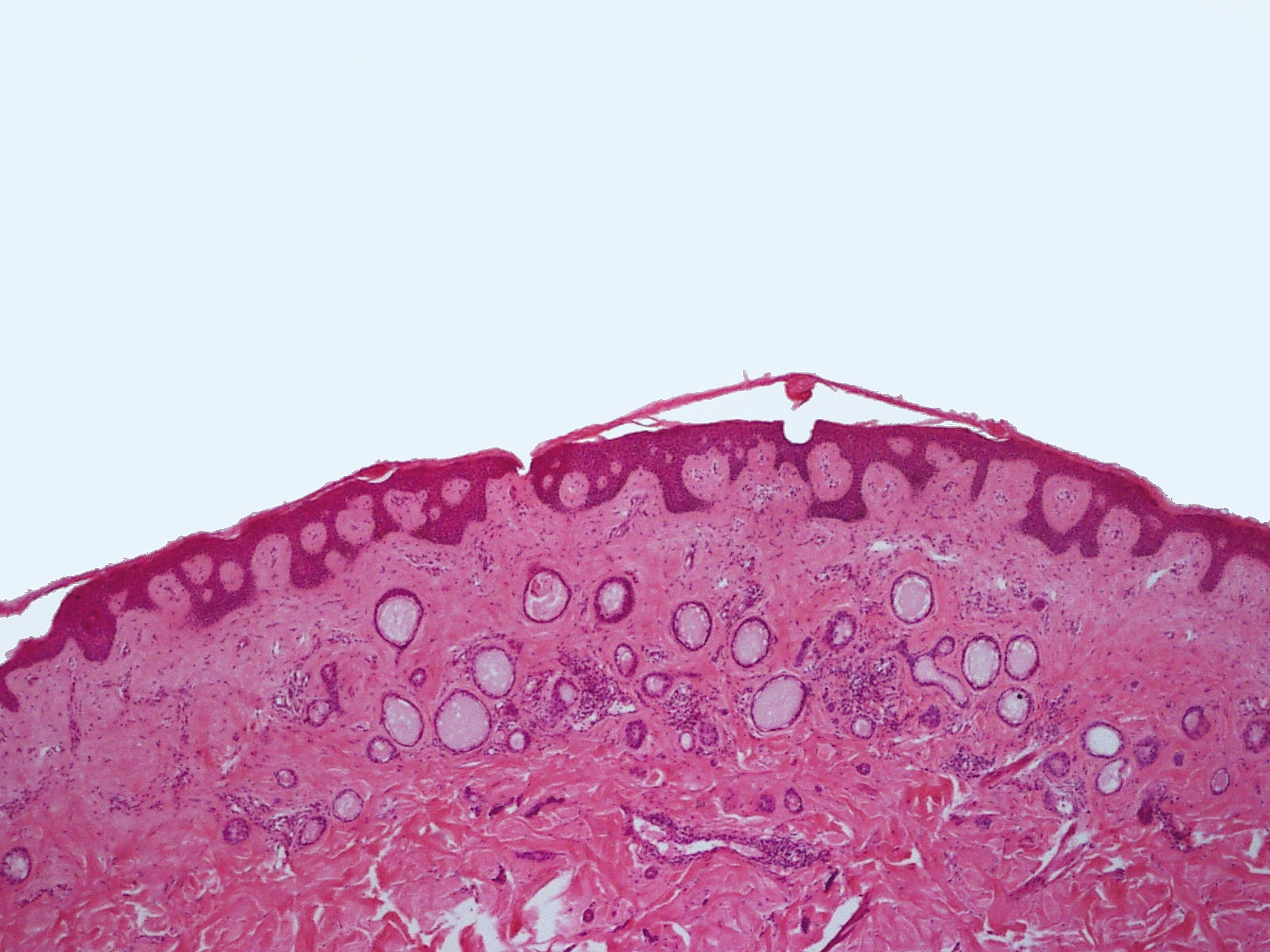
Syringoma (eccrine)

The pathophysiology of syringomas remains largely unknown. Familial patterns presenting in an autosomal-dominant pattern suggest a genetic link that can result in varying genetic aberrations in lesions, specifically chromosome 16q22. The most commonly accepted theory is that syringomas are benign growths that arise from the intraepidermal portion of eccrine ducts. Another theory suggests that syringomas are a reactive hyperplasia rather than a true neoplasm resulting after inflammatory processes such as eczema. A hamartomatous process possibly could explain eruptive syringomas. A hamartoma of pluripotent stem cells could precede the pathological process. Syringomas may also be under hormonal influence, explaining the female predominance.

== Diagnosis ==
Syringomas can often be diagnosed clinically based on presentation, distribution patterns over the body, lack of associated symptoms, and family history. A definitive diagnosis requires a skin biopsy to allow the tissue to be examined under a microscope. Histologically, syringomas have a characteristic comma-shaped ("tadpole") tail of dilated, cystic eccrine ducts.

== Treatment ==
The goal of treatment is to improve the appearance of lesions, since they are otherwise not serious and typically do not cause symptoms. Many treatment methods have been attempted, but complete removal is uncommon. No single treatment method has been shown to work consistently. Both medical and surgical treatments have been studied, each with variable success. Common destructive treatment methods include carbon dioxide lasers, dermabrasion, surgical excision, electrocoagulation, and chemical peels. Many of these methods are very time-consuming and require multiple treatment sessions. Carbon dioxide lasers are the most commonly practiced method; they can cause thermal damage, though, leading to scarring in the area. Medical therapies include topical atropine, topical retinoids, and oral tranilast.

The most common adverse effects include redness, skin discoloration, and pain. Other side effects include blistering and scarring.

== See also ==
- Acrospiroma
- List of cutaneous conditions
- List of cutaneous neoplasms associated with systemic syndromes
