= Desmoplastic trichoepithelioma =

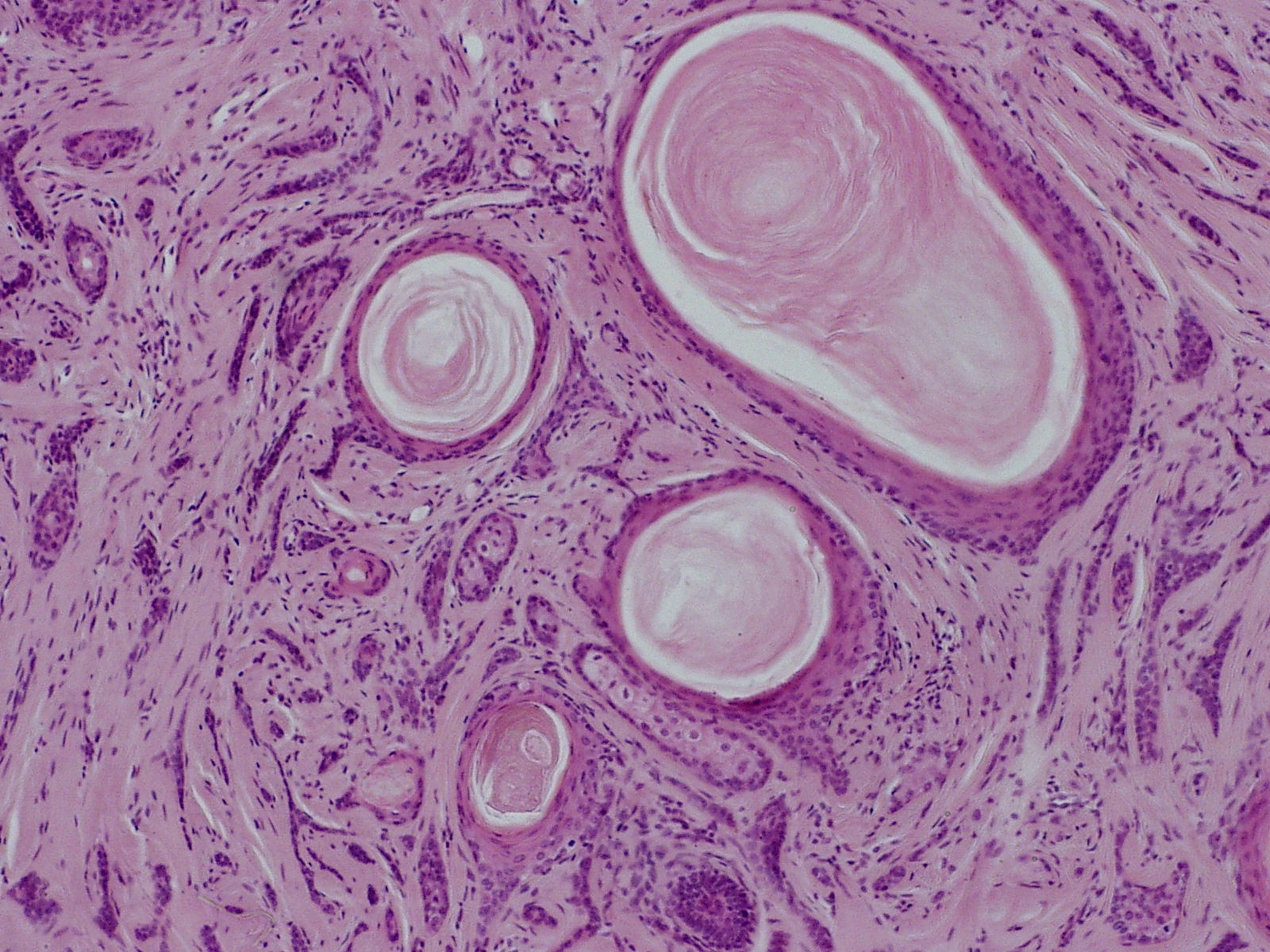
- Desmoplastic trichoepithelioma or sclerosing epithelial hamartoma
- Specialty: Dermatology

Desmoplastic trichoepithelioma is a cutaneous condition characterized by a solitary, firm skin lesion on the face. Familial cases have been reported suggesting a possible genetic link.

The diagnosis is made based on clinical and morphological features. Differential diagnosis includes trichoepithelioma, microcystic adnexal carcinoma, morpheaform basal cell carcinoma, and syringoma.

Surgical excision is the treatment of choice.

Desmoplastic trichoepithelioma is more common in females and usually affects children or adults.

== Signs and symptoms ==
Desmoplastic trichoepithelioma manifests as a firm, soft, or white to yellowish annular nodule or papule on the cheeks or face with a central indentation.

== Causes ==
Familial desmoplastic trichoepitheliomas have been reported suggesting a possible genetic link.

== Diagnosis ==
Desmoplastic trichoepithelioma can be diagnosed based on clinical and morphological features. Desmoplastic trichoepithelioma may resemble other tumors such as conventional trichoepithelioma, microcystic adnexal carcinoma, morpheaform basal cell carcinoma, and syringoma both clinically and histopathologically.

== Treatment ==
The preferred course of treatment is surgical excision. Nonetheless, Mohs microscopic surgery is the method of choice for lesions, particularly those on the face.

== Epidemiology ==
Desmoplastic trichoepithelioma is more common in females. It has a bimodal age distribution and usually affects adults or small children. Desmoplastic trichoepithelioma accounts for less than 1% of all cutaneous tumors.

== See also ==
- Trichoepithelioma
- Skin lesion
