= Hidrocystoma =

Sac growth (cyst) of the sweat glands

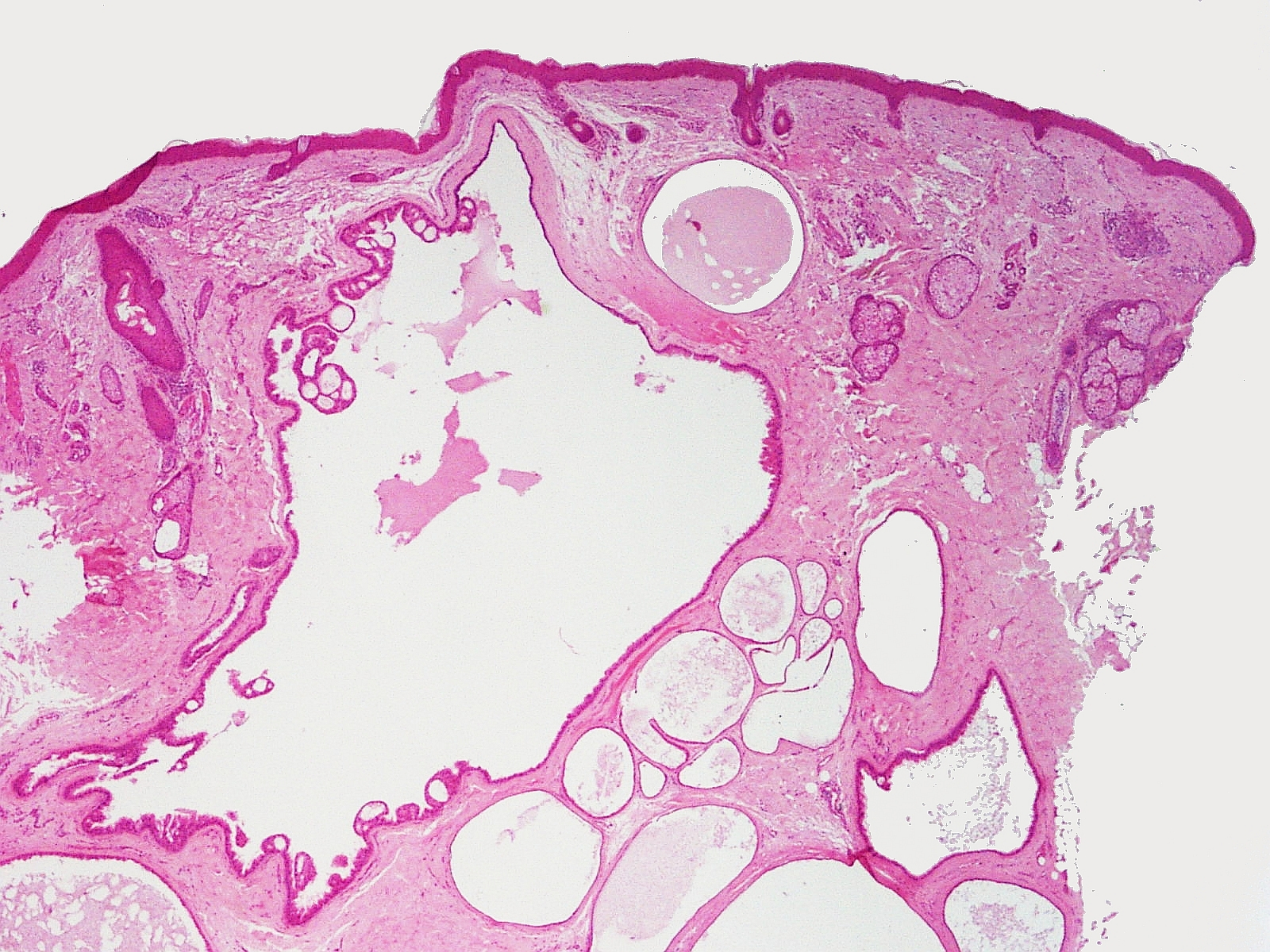
- Specialty: Pathology

Hidrocystoma (also known as cystadenoma, a Moll's gland cyst, and a sudoriferous cyst) is an adenoma of the sweat glands.

Hidrocystomas are cysts of sweat ducts, usually on the eyelids. They are not tumours (a similar-sounding lesion called hidradenoma is a benign tumour).

The three types of "sweat" glands are: True sweat glands or eccrine glands, sebaceous glands, which have an oily secretion around hair follicles, and apocrine glands, which have more oily product than eccrine glands and are found on the face, armpit, and groin.

Hidrocystomas usually arise from apocrine glands. They are also called cysts of Moll or sudoriferous cysts. A type of hidroadenoma that arises from eccrine glands is uncommon.

Other related conditions on the eyelids include chalazion (a granulomatous reaction to sebaceous glands on the eyelid), lacrimal duct cysts (cysts related to tear ducts), and nasolacrimal duct cysts (the nasolacrimal duct drains tears into the nose via a punctum on the lower eyelid).

== Additional images ==
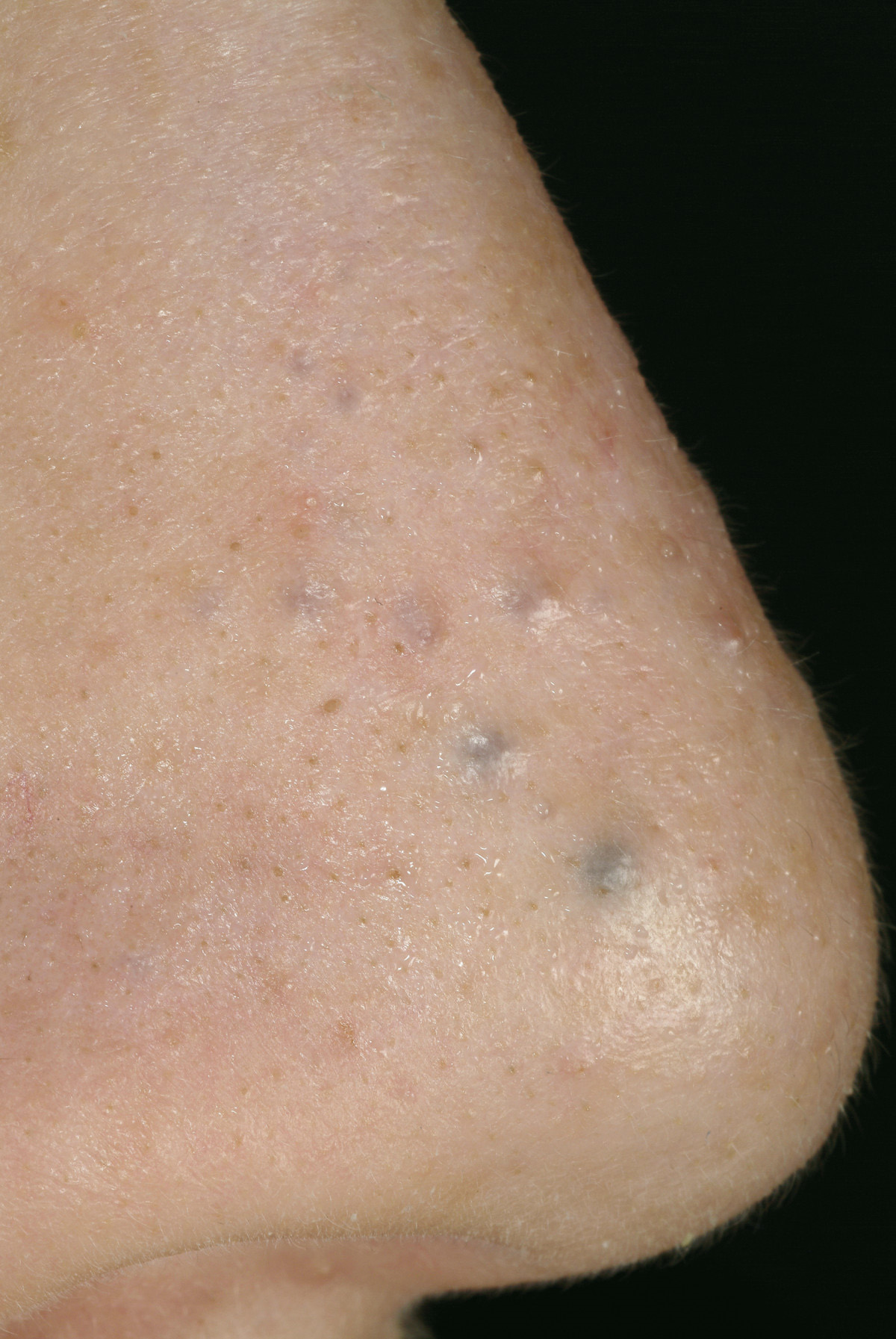
Eccrine hydrocystoma

== See also ==
- Syringoma
- Acrospiroma
- Seborrheic keratosis
- List of cutaneous conditions
- List of cutaneous neoplasms associated with systemic syndromes
