= List of cutaneous neoplasms associated with systemic syndromes =

Many cutaneous neoplasms occur in the setting of systemic syndromes.

Cutaneous neoplasms associated with systemic syndromes
Neoplasm	Associated syndrome(s)
Trichoepithelioma	Brooke–Spiegler syndrome Rombo syndrome Rasmussen syndrome Brooke–Fordyce syndrome Bazex–Dupré–Christol syndrome
Cylindroma	Brooke–Spiegler syndrome Rasmussen syndrome
Psammomatous melanotic schwannoma	Carney complex
Sclerotic fibroma	Cowden syndrome
Trichilemmoma	Cowden syndrome Bannayan–Riley–Ruvalcaba syndrome
Sebaceous adenoma	Muir–Torre syndrome
Sebaceous carcinoma	Muir–Torre syndrome
Syringofibroadenoma	Clouston syndrome Schöpf–Schulz–Passarge syndrome
Syringoma	Down syndrome Nicolau–Balus syndrome Brooke–Spiegler syndrome
Trichodiscoma	Birt–Hogg–Dubé syndrome
Hidrocystoma	Schöpf–Schulz–Passarge syndrome
Pilomatricoma	Turner syndrome
Poroma	Schöpf–Schulz–Passarge syndrome Clouston syndrome
Spiradenoma	Brooke–Spiegler syndrome
Fibrofolliculoma	Birt–Hogg–Dubé syndrome
Clear cell acanthoma	Ichthyosis
Acrochordon	Birt–Hogg–Dubé syndrome
Epidermal inclusion cyst with pilomatrical differentiation	Gardner's syndrome
Gardner fibroma	Familial adenomatous polyposis and its variant, Gardner's syndrome
Dermoid tumor	Familial adenomatous polyposis and its variant, Gardner's syndrome

== See also ==
- List of cutaneous conditions
- List of contact allergens
- List of cutaneous conditions associated with increased risk of nonmelanoma skin cancer
- List of cutaneous conditions associated with internal malignancy
- List of cutaneous conditions caused by mutations in keratins
- List of cutaneous conditions caused by problems with junctional proteins
- List of dental abnormalities associated with cutaneous conditions
- List of genes mutated in cutaneous conditions
- List of genes mutated in pigmented cutaneous lesions
- List of histologic stains that aid in diagnosis of cutaneous conditions
- List of immunofluorescence findings for autoimmune bullous conditions
- List of inclusion bodies that aid in diagnosis of cutaneous conditions
- List of keratins expressed in the human integumentary system
- List of radiographic findings associated with cutaneous conditions
- List of specialized glands within the human integumentary system
- List of target antigens in pemphigoid
- List of target antigens in pemphigus
- List of verrucous carcinoma subtypes
