= Clouston's hidrotic ectodermal dysplasia =

Medical condition affecting scalp hair

Clouston's hidrotic ectodermal dysplasia is a medical condition caused by mutations in a connexin gene, GJB6 or connexin-30, characterized by scalp hair that is wiry, brittle, and pale. It is often associated with patchy alopecia.

== Presentation ==
Hidrotic ectodermal dysplasia 2, or Clouston syndrome (HED2) is characterized by partial or total alopecia, dystrophy of the nails, hyperpigmentation of the skin (especially over the joints), and clubbing of the fingers. Sparse scalp hair and dysplastic nails are seen early in life. In infancy, scalp hair is wiry, brittle, patchy, and pale. Progressive hair loss may lead to total alopecia by puberty. The nails may be milky white in early childhood and then gradually become dystrophic, thick, and distally separated from the nail bed. Palmoplantar keratoderma may develop during childhood and increases in severity with age. The clinical manifestations are highly variable even within the same family.

== Genetics ==
HED2 is inherited in an autosomal dominant manner. Most individuals with HED2 have an affected parent. De novo gene mutations have also been reported. Offspring of affected individuals have a 50% chance of inheriting the mutation and being affected.

== Diagnosis ==
HED2 is suspected after infancy on the basis of physical features in most affected individuals. GJB6 is the only gene known to be associated with HED2. Targeted mutation analysis for the four most common GJB6 mutations is available on a clinical basis and detects mutations in approximately 100% of affected individuals. Sequence analysis is also available on a clinical basis for those in whom none of the four known mutations is identified.

== Screening ==
Prenatal testing for pregnancies at increased risk is possible if the disease-causing mutation in an affected family member is known; however, requests for prenatal testing for conditions such as HED2 are not common.

== Treatment ==
HED2 symptoms can be treated with special hair care products to help manage dry and sparse hair, wigs, artificial nails and emollients to relieve palmoplantar hyperkeratosis.

== See also ==
- Palmoplantar keratoderma
- List of cutaneous conditions
- List of cutaneous neoplasms associated with systemic syndromes
