= Bazex–Dupré–Christol syndrome =

- Other names: Bazex syndrome, follicular atrophoderma and basal cell carcinomas
- This condition is inherited in an X-linked dominant manner.

Bazex–Dupré–Christol syndrome is a very rare condition inherited in an X-linked dominant fashion. Physical findings typically include follicular atrophoderma, multiple basal cell carcinomas, hypotrichosis, and hypohidrosis.

== Genetics ==
BCDS is inherited in an X-linked dominant manner. This means the defective gene responsible for the disorder is located on the X chromosome, and only one copy of the defective gene is sufficient to cause the disorder when inherited from a parent who has the disorder. Males are normally hemizygous for the X chromosome, having only one copy. As a result, X-linked dominant disorders usually show higher expressivity in males than females.

As the X chromosome is one of the sex chromosomes (the other being the Y chromosome), X-linked inheritance is determined by the sex of the parent carrying a specific gene and can often seem complex. This is because, typically, females have two copies of the X-chromosome, while males have only one copy. The difference between dominant and recessive inheritance patterns also plays a role in determining the chances of a child inheriting an X-linked disorder from their parentage.A locus of Xq24-q27 has been described.

== Diagnosis ==
Genetic testing of x linked dominant pattern associated with various neoplasm nnn (e.g. basal cell carcinoma)

== See also ==
- Crouzon syndrome
- List of cutaneous conditions
- List of cutaneous neoplasms associated with systemic syndromes
