= Sclerotic fibroma =

- Specialty: Dermatology

Sclerotic fibromas are a cutaneous condition characterized by well-circumscribed, dome-shaped, dermal hypocellular nodules composed predominantly of sclerotic thick collagen bundles.

== See also ==
- Blepharochalasis
- List of cutaneous conditions
- List of cutaneous neoplasms associated with systemic syndromes
