= Solitary trichoepithelioma =

- Specialty: Dermatology

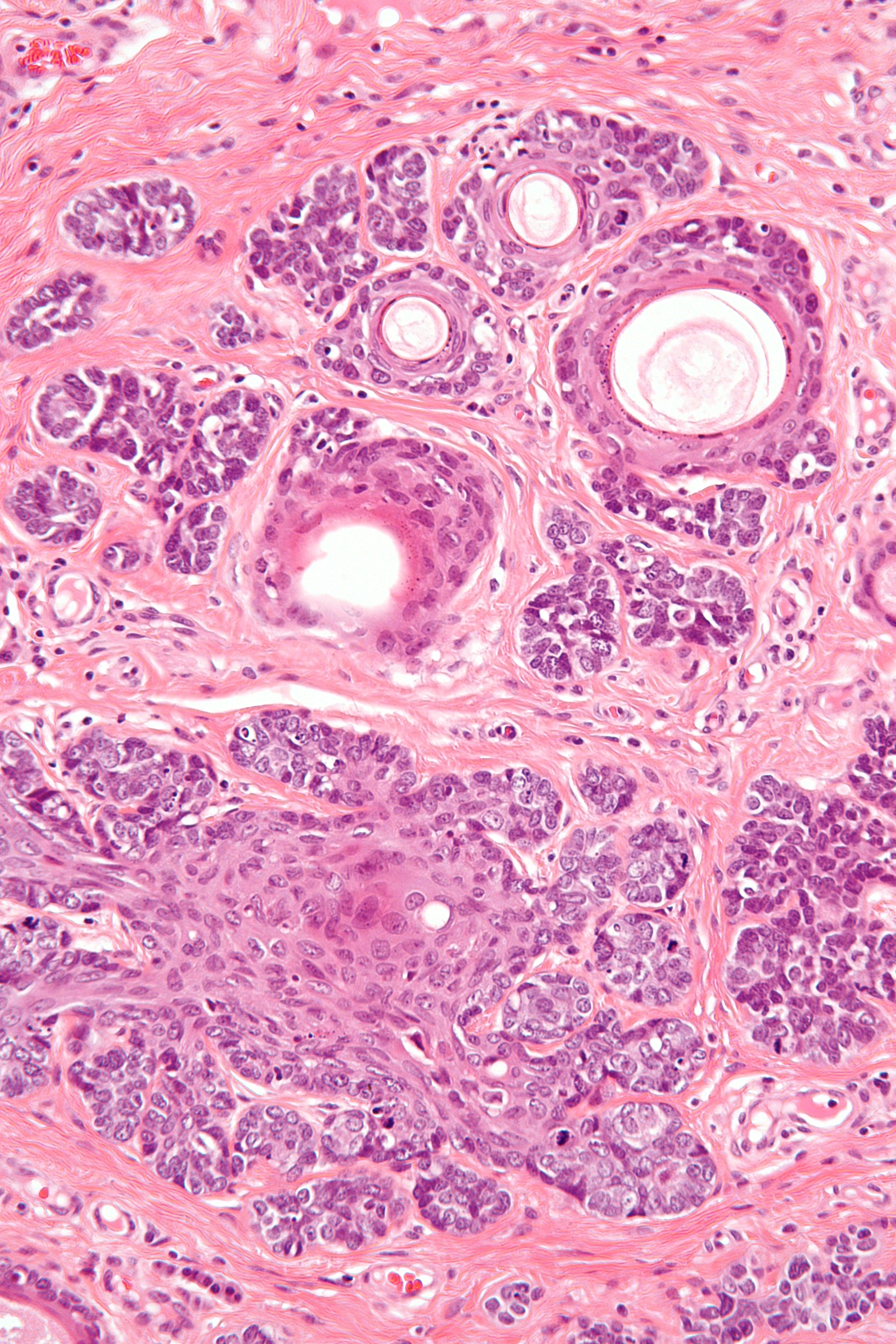
High magnification micrograph of a trichoepithelioma. H&E stain.

Solitary trichoepithelioma is a cutaneous condition characterized by a firm dermal papules or nodules most commonly occurring on the face.

== See also ==
- Trichoepithelioma
- Skin lesion
