= Nicolau–Balus syndrome =

- Specialty: Dermatology

Nicolau–Balus syndrome is a cutaneous condition characterized by syringomas and milia.

== See also ==
- Parry–Romberg syndrome
- List of cutaneous conditions
- List of cutaneous neoplasms associated with systemic syndromes
