= Hidradenocarcinoma =

- Other names: Malignant hidradenoma, malignant acrospiroma, clear cell eccrine carcinoma, or primary mucoepidermoid cutaneous carcinoma.
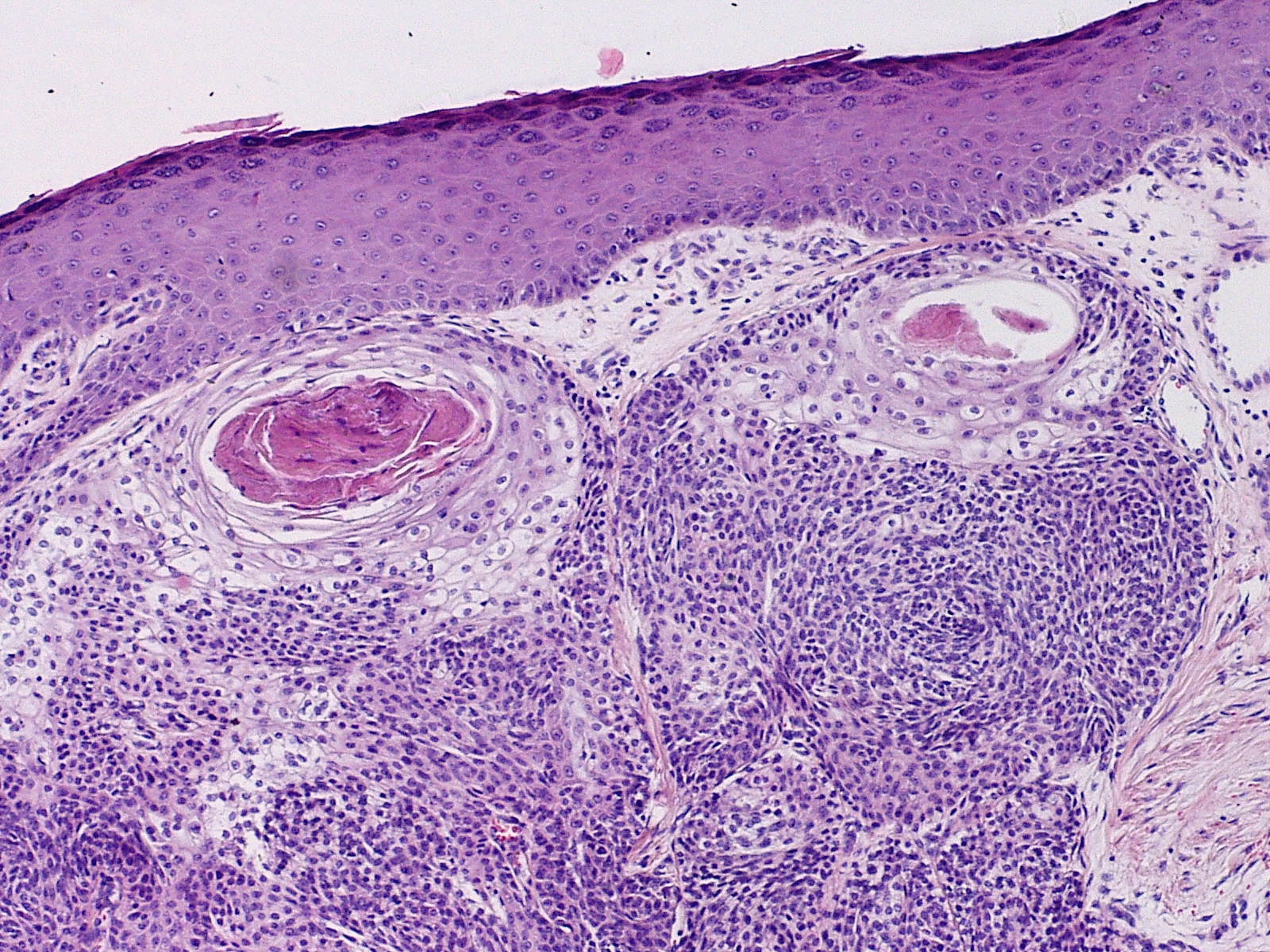
- Clear cell hidradenocarcinoma
- Specialty: Dermatology

Hidradenocarcinoma, also known as malignant hidradenoma, malignant acrospiroma, clear cell eccrine carcinoma, or primary mucoepidermoid cutaneous carcinoma, is a malignant adnexal tumor of the sweat gland. It is the malignant variant of the benign hidradenoma. It may develop de novo or in association with an existent hidradenoma.

This type of tumor typically develops in older individuals (after age 40).

== See also ==
- Hidradenoma papilliferum
- List of cutaneous conditions
