= Glial tumor =

Central nervous system tumor

Glial tumor is a general term for numerous tumors of the central nervous system, including astrocytomas, ependymal tumors, Oligodendroglioma, and primitive neuroectodermal tumors. The World Health Organization (WHO) classifies tumors into different categories according to severity and recurrence. The first tumor classified as grade I is called pilocytic astrocytoma and it is most commonly observed in children rather than adults. The next tumor is never common in the Dns called diffuse astrocytoma and it is considered a grade II, they are benign, or noncancerous, but can become malignant, meaning cancerous, as the tumor progresses. Grades III and grade IV are considered malignant astrocytomas. Anaplastic astrocytomas are considered by the WHO to be a grade III astrocytoma and Glioblastoma is a grade IV both are referred to high-grade glial tumors.

Ependymal tumors are another glial tumor type of the central nervous system. These are tumors which have cells which resemble the ependymal cells of the ventricles within the brain and the spinal cord. These too are classified into different categories according to their severity of aggression. Least aggressive ependymal tumors include Subependymomas and Myxopapillary ependymoma which are classified as grade I. The most severe are classified as grade III and are called anaplastic ependymomas and these usually occur at the base of the spine.

Oligodendroglioma is another type of glial tumor. They are rare. They normally appear in the white matter of the cerebrum. Although the causes are not known, there are other studies which suggest the deletion of 1p/19q deletion is imperative for chemotherapy treatment. Oligodendroglioma are very different histologically, from brain tissue due to their sharp borders and their distinctive "fried egg" characteristic.
