= Follicular atrophoderma =

- Specialty: Dermatology

Follicular atrophoderma is a skin condition consisting of follicular indentations without hairs, notably occurring on extensor surfaces of the hands, legs and arms.

== See also ==
- Skin lesion
- List of cutaneous conditions
