= Hidradenoma =

Benign tumor of the sweat glands

- Other names: Acrospiroma, cystadenoma, hydrocystadenomas
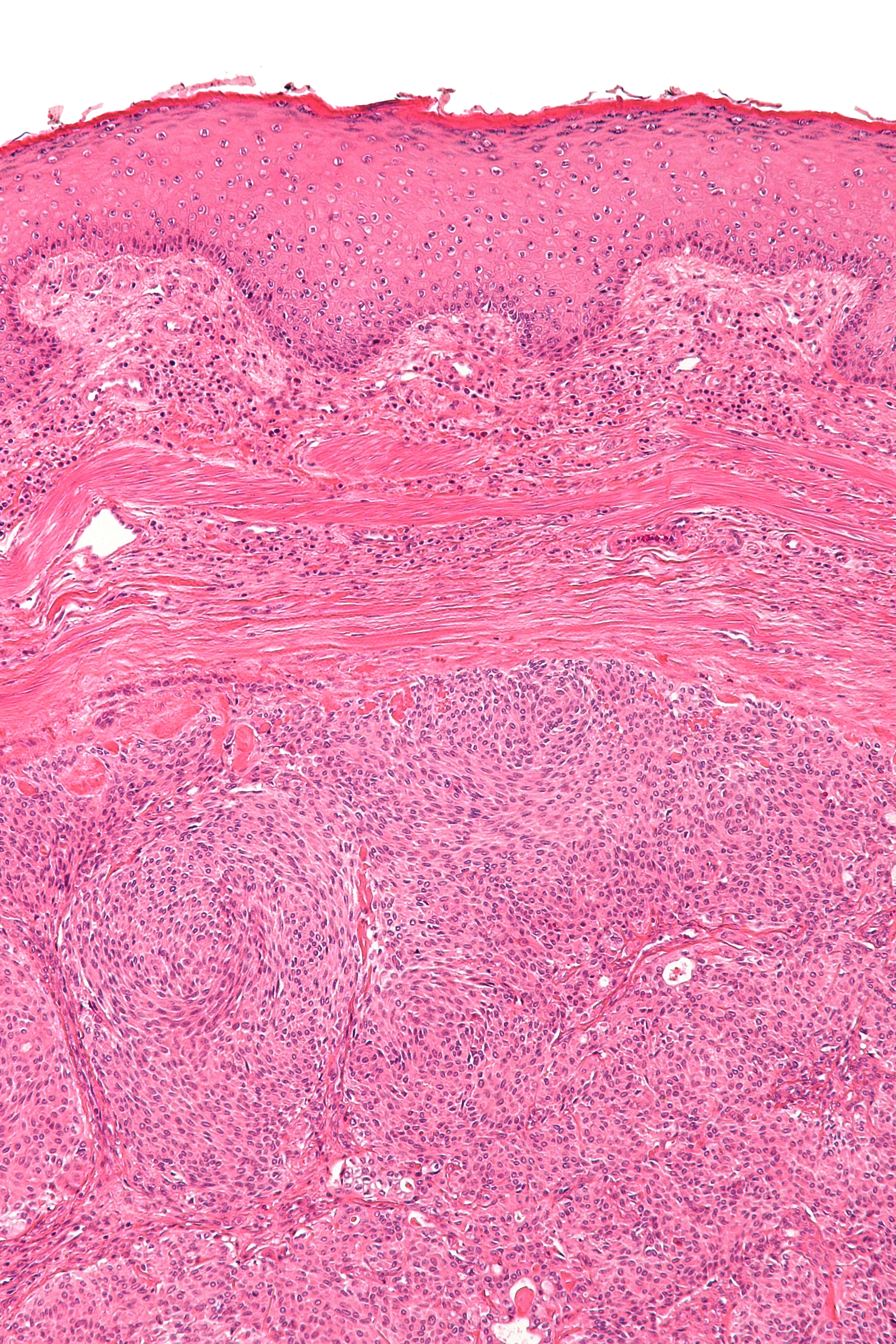
- Micrograph showing an acrospiroma. H&E stain.
- Specialty: Dermatology

Hidradenoma refers to a benign adnexal tumor of the apical sweat gland. These are 1–3 cm translucent blue cystic nodules. It usually presents as a single, small skin-colored lesion, and may be considered closely related to or a variant of poromas. Hidradenomas are often sub-classified based on subtle histologic differences, for example:

- Eccrine acrospiroma
- Clear-cell hidradenoma or acrospiroma
- Nodular hidradenoma or acrospiroma
- Solid-cystic hidradenoma

Discussion of sweat gland tumors can be difficult and confusing due to the complex classification and redundant terminology used to describe the same tumors. For example, acrospiroma and hidradenoma are synonymous, and sometimes the term acrospiroma is used to generally describe benign sweat gland tumors. In addition, a single lesion may contain a mixture of cell-types. There has also been a change in understanding about how tumors that were previously believed to strictly derive from specific sweat gland types may, in fact, derive from both eccrine or apocrine glands.

Hidradenomas are by definition benign, with malignant transformation very rare. When tumors show malignant characteristics, they are known as hidradenocarcinoma. Surgical excision is usually curative and local recurrences are rare, although malignant tumors may metastasize.

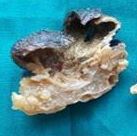
Gross pathology of a cystic nodular hidradenoma

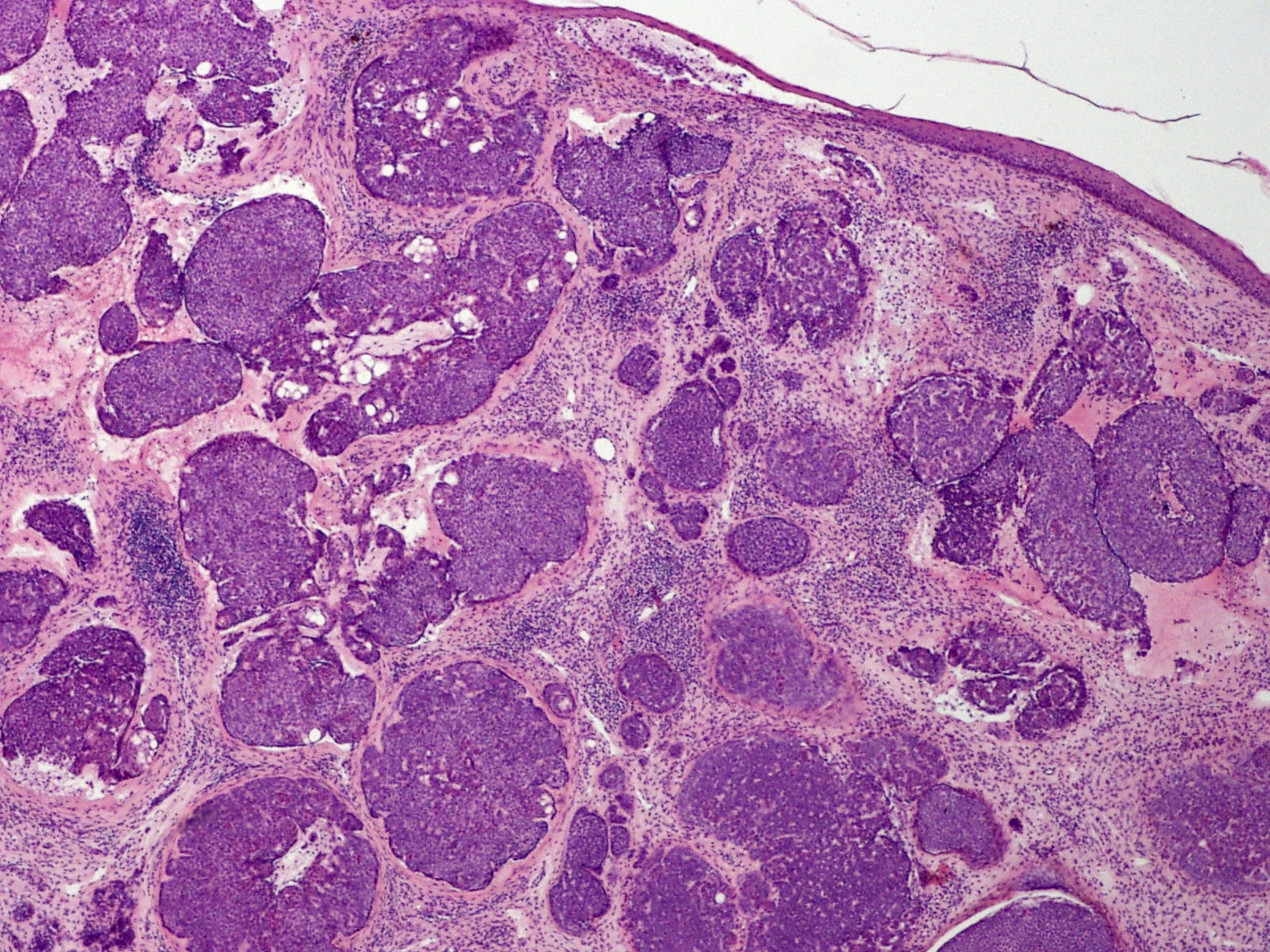
Dermal duct tumor

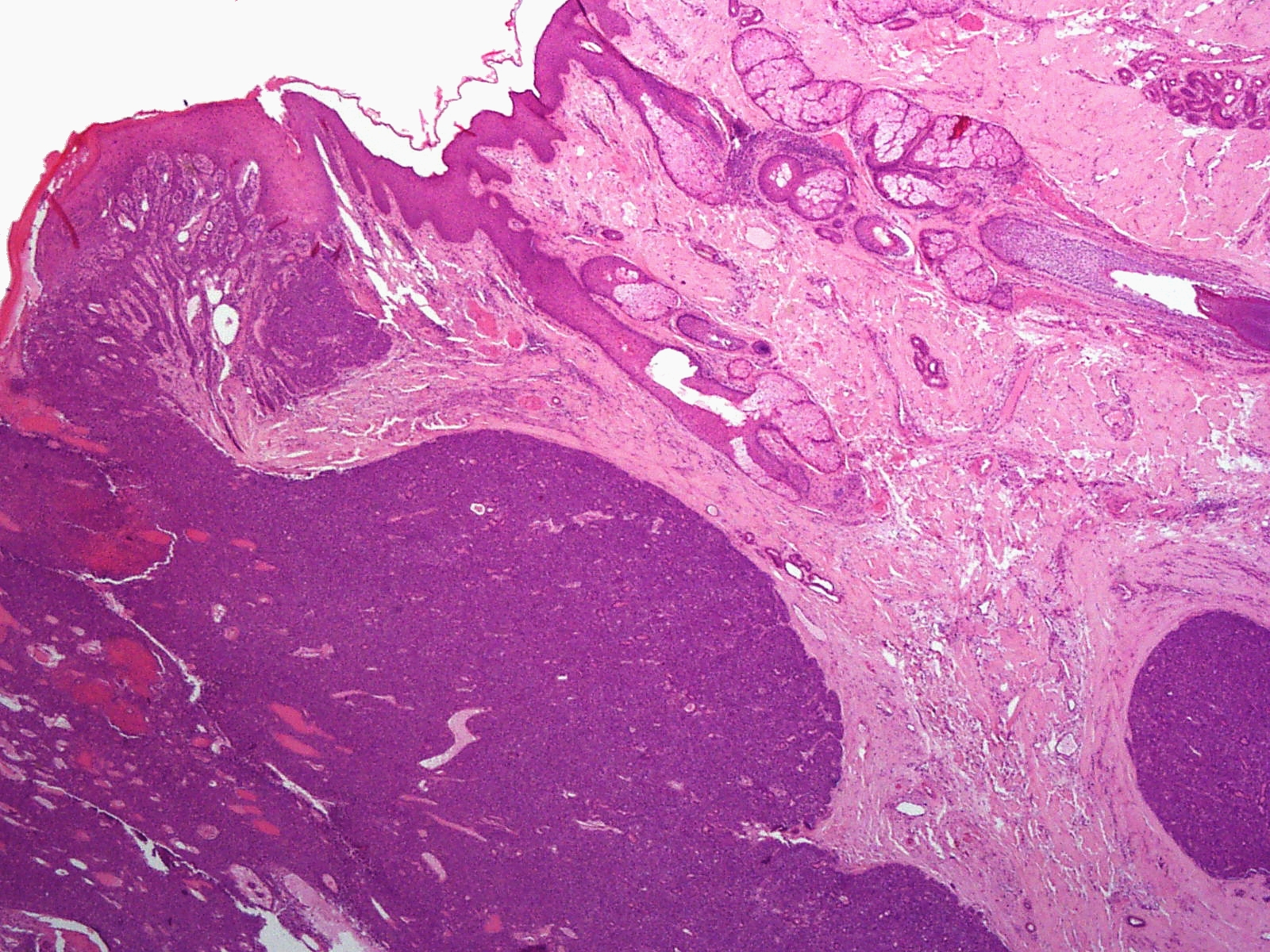
Acrospiroma, solid type

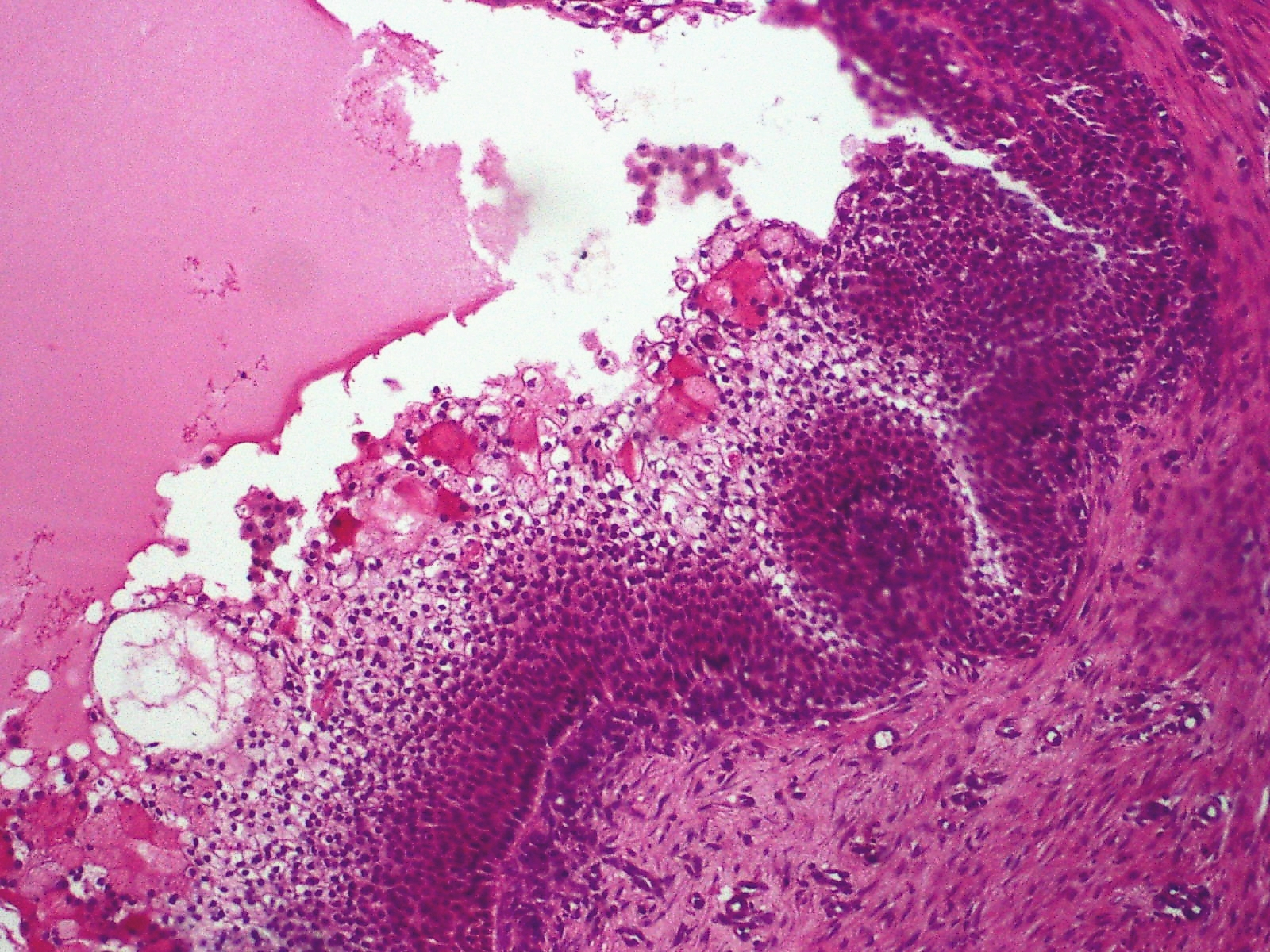
Acrospiroma, clear cell type

== See also ==
- Spiroma
- List of cutaneous conditions
- List of cutaneous neoplasms associated with systemic syndromes
