= Syringofibroadenoma =

- Other names: Acrosyringeal nevus of Weedon and Lewis
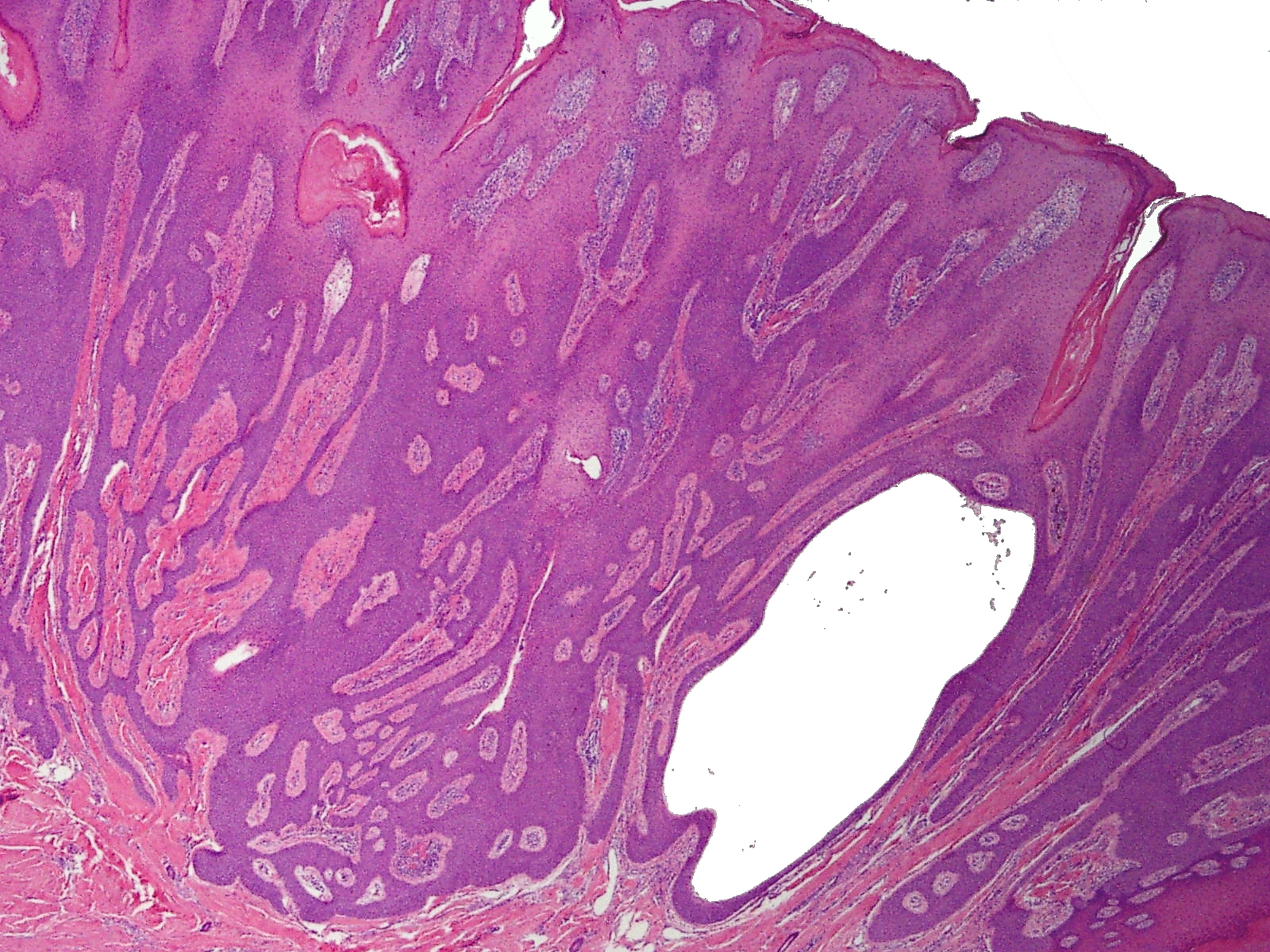
- Specialty: Dermatology

Syringofibroadenoma is a cutaneous condition characterized by a hyperkeratotic nodule or plaque involving the extremities.

It is considered of eccrine origin.

== See also ==
- Syringadenoma papilliferum
- Skin lesion
