= Trichoepithelioma =

- Other names: Brooke's tumour Epithelioma adenoides cysticum .
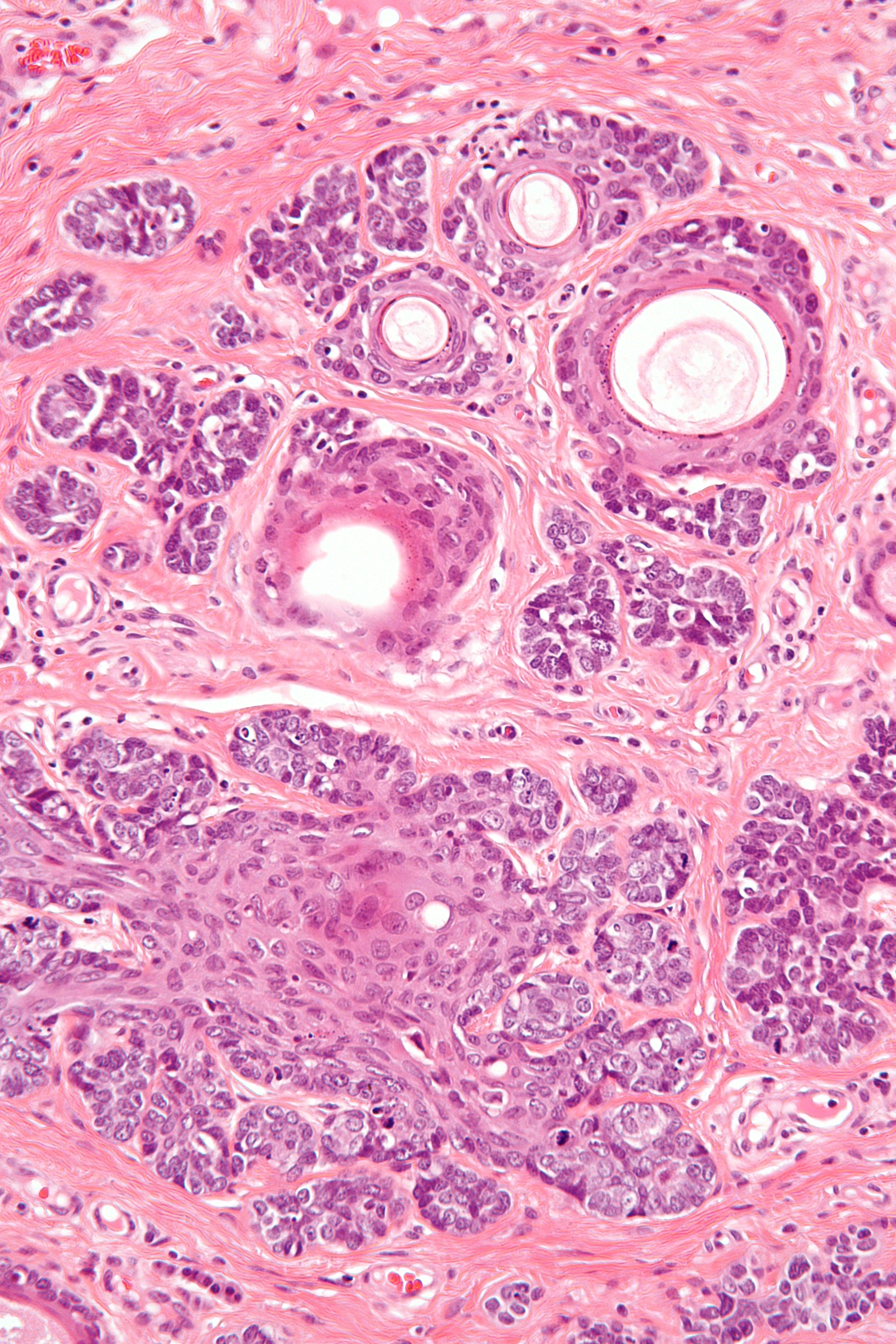
- Micrograph of a trichoepithelioma. H&E stain.
- Specialty: Dermatology
- Usual onset: usually young adults
- Diagnostic method: Clinical history and examination are important. In a significant number of patients there is a familial trait. Examination will white, translucent, slightly raised papules which have a pearly white appearance.
- Treatment: Any suspicicion of malignant change calls for adequate excision and histological examination. The only other reason for treatment is cosmetic . Partial destruction is usually followed by regrowth. Many treatment modalities may be used including surgical excision, curettage, cryotherapy and dermabrasion. High-energy pulsed carbon dioxide laser has also been advocated as a useful treatment.

Trichoepithelioma is a neoplasm of the adnexa of the skin. Its appearance is similar to basal cell carcinoma.

One form has been mapped to chromosome 9p21.

== Types ==
Trichoepitheliomas may be divided into the following types:

- Multiple familial trichoepithelioma
- Solitary trichoepithelioma
- Desmoplastic trichoepithelioma

== Pathology ==
Trichoepitheliomas consists of nests of basaloid cells, with palisading. They lack the myxoid stroma and artefactual clefting seen in basal cell carcinoma. Mitoses are uncommon when compared to basal cell carcinoma.

== Diagnosis ==
Trichoepiteliomas often contain Merkel cells; an immunostain for CK20 can be used to demonstrate this.

== See also ==
- Trichoblastoma
- Pilomatricoma
- CYLD cutaneous syndrome
- List of cutaneous conditions
- List of cutaneous neoplasms associated with systemic syndromes
