= Cutaneous leiomyoma =

- Other names: Cutaneous leiomyomata, leiomyoma cutis
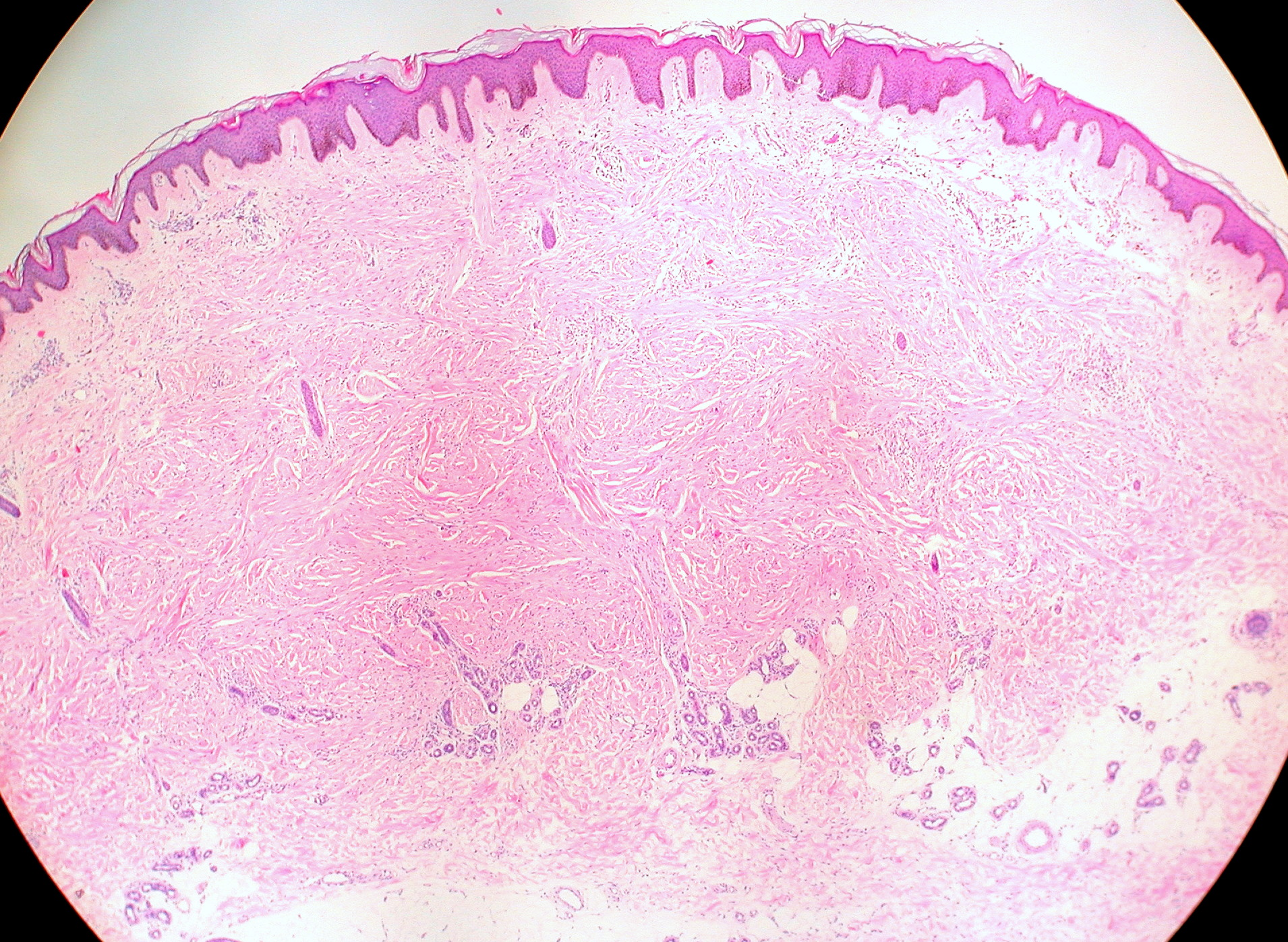
- Cutaneous Leiomyoma
- Specialty: Dermatology

Cutaneous leiomyoma, also known as leiomyoma cutis, or cutaneous leiomyomata, is a benign skin tumor made of smooth muscle cells. There are three different types of cutaneous leiomyomas, genital leiomyomas, angioleiomyomas, and piloleiomyomas. Cutaneous leiomyomas can occur sporadically or as a part of a genetic condition. Cutaneous leiomyomas are diagnosed by histopathology and treated by surgical excision.

== Signs and symptoms ==
Piloleiomyomas can be single or many, and they are derived from the arrector pili muscles of the pilosebaceous unit. The tumours are firm, reddish-brown to skin-colored papulonodules, ranging in diameter from few mm to 2 cm; older lesions exhibit progressive expansion. Although lesions are immobile on the skin, they can move freely over deeply ingrained structures. Blaschko's lines are frequently the center of many piloleiomyomas, while reports of linear, segmental, and zosteriform patterns have also been made. Usually related to cold, pressure, or emotion, 90% of piloleiomyomas cause pain, characterized as burning, pinching, or stabbing.

Genital leiomyomas are rare, solitary growths originating from dartoic, vulvar, or mammary smooth muscle that present similarly to piloleiomyomas, and they include tumors of the nipple. Nonetheless, in contrast to piloleiomyomas, genitalia tumors usually do not cause discomfort and manifest as pedunculated papules on the scrotum, vulva, or nipple, or as unilateral papulonodules measuring less than 2 cm (scrotal and vulvar lesions can measure up to 9 and 15 cm, respectively). The most common genital leiomyoma variations are scrotal and vulvar leiomyomas, with vulvar tumors exhibiting growth during pregnancy.

Angioleiomyomas are uncommon extracutaneous tumors that arise from the tunica media of small- to medium-sized arteries and veins. These tumors appear as firm nodules in the subcutaneous or, in rare cases, dermal regions of the extremities. They are well-circumscribed, vascularized, and differentiated. Most lesions occur in the upper extremities of males and lower extremities of females, with around half of them being painful to the touch or extremely cold, particularly those of the solid and cavernous subtypes.

== Causes ==
Cutaneous leiomyomas may happen sporadically or in relation to renal cell cancer in the autosomal dominant condition known as hereditary leiomyomatosis and renal cell cancer.

== Diagnosis ==
A hematoxylin and eosin-stained sample of the papule or nodule can be examined under a microscope to diagnose cutaneous leiomyomas.

All cutaneous leiomyomas typically exhibit interlacing fascicles of spindle cells with considerable levels of eosinophilic cytoplasm and a blunt-ended, elongated, cigar-shaped nucleus with perinuclear halos on cross section when stained with hematoxylin and eosin (H&E). Commonly used smooth muscle stains like Masson's trichrome, aniline blue, Von-Gieson, and phosphotungstic acid hematoxylin (PTAH) are positive for smooth muscle markers like actin and desmin.

=== Classification ===
Three types of cutaneous leiomyomas are distinguished: genital leiomyomas, angioleiomyomas, and piloleiomyomas, which originate from the arrector pili muscle.

Angioleiomyomas are thought to start from smooth muscle (tunica medium) found in the walls of arteries and veins, while piloleiomyomas are thought to originate from the arrector pili muscle of the pilosebaceous unit. Genital leiomyomas include those originating from the erectile muscle of the nipple, the dartos muscle of the scrotum, and the labia majora.

== Treatment ==
The most effective treatment is surgery, despite its high recurrence rate following excision. However, a surgical treatment can be limited by numerous lesions or unsatisfactory aesthetic outcomes. Cryotherapy, intralesional BTA injection, and CO_{2} ablation laser have all demonstrated some degree of pain alleviation in these situations.

== Epidemiology ==
Adults are more prone than children to have cutaneous leiomyomas, which often appear in the fifth and sixth decades of life. Seventy-five percent of extra-uterine leiomyomas are cutaneous and make up about 5% of all leiomyomas.

== See also ==
- Genital leiomyoma
- Angioleiomyoma
- Piloleiomyoma
