= Myoma =

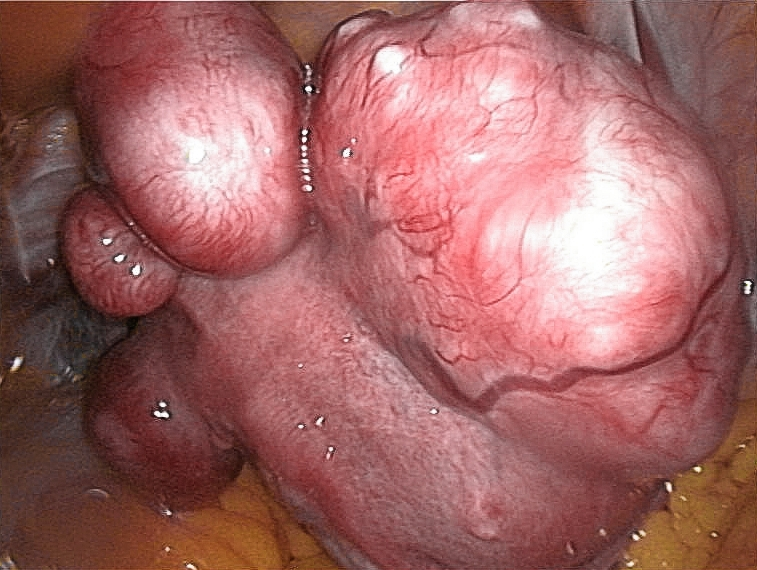
- Uterine fibroids
- Specialty: Oncology

A myoma is a type of tumor that involves muscle cells. There are two main types of myoma:

- Leiomyomas which occur in smooth muscle. They most commonly occur as uterine fibroids, but may also form in other locations.
- Rhabdomyomas which occur in striated muscle. They are rare tumors. So-called adult rhabdomyoma has been diagnosed mostly in men aged >40 years, whereas fetal rhabdomyoma occurs between birth and early childhood (<3 years). They very rarely become malignant.

Whether or not angiomyomas are a type of leiomyoma or a separate entity is disputed as of 2014.

Myomas are benign tumors of the uterus that can affect the fertility of a woman depending mainly on three factors:

1. Size (cut off value 4-5 cm)
2. Number
3. Location (they can be intramural, subserous or submucous). Submucous ones are worst from a fertility point of view, while subserous are less dangerous.

Some of the most common symptoms are: abundant menstrual bleeding, longer menstrual periods, pelvic pressure, constipation, a need to urinate continuously.
