= Nevoid melanoma =

Type of skin cancer

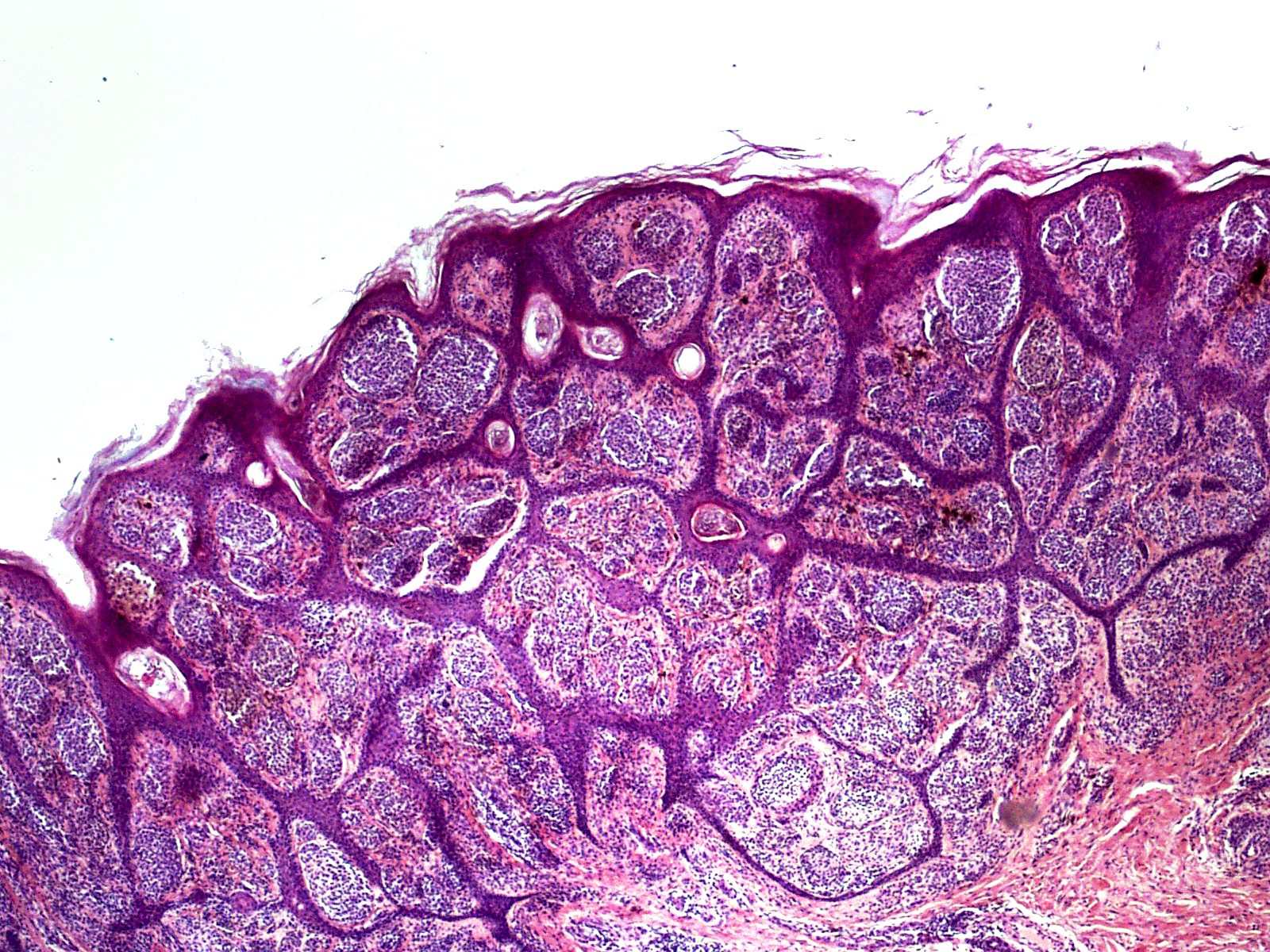
Nevoid melanoma

A nevoid melanoma is a malignant neoplastic lesion of the skin. It is a type of melanoma, the most dangerous form of skin cancer. Nevoid melanomas are clinically significant because they are difficult to distinguish from a benign nevus of the skin, which requires no treatment and is common on most individuals. Nevoid morphologies represent up to 3% of all cases of melanoma.

Like other forms of melanoma, a nevoid melanoma can become a life-threatening disease through the process of metastasis, after the tumor cells invade through tissue layers and spread to other parts of the body.

== Gross appearance ==
Nevoid melanomas are difficult to identify because of their strong resemblance to benign nevi of the skin. They are either black or brown in general color, but may possess small patches of blue, gray, or other coloration which often cannot be seen without a dermatoscope. They are perfectly or near-perfectly symmetrical. Nevoid melanomas frequently present as isolated papules, nodules, or wart-like in appearance. In most cases, the melanoma will appear with smooth, rounded, regular borders; all of these qualities are seen in harmless skin nevi but not other forms of melanoma, adding to the difficulty of identifying a nevoid melanoma.

Clinical appearance at the time of diagnosis is highly variable. Many melanomas progress from being indistinguishable from benign nevi to much more abnormal presentations, such as sore-like bleeding, shiny papules, atypical moles, and classically-appearing melanomas. Any normal-appearing nevus that rapidly transitions to a new appearance should be considered as a possible melanoma.

== Histology ==
High-powered imaging tools may identify one or more traits that prove a lesion is a melanoma rather than a benign nevus:

- Slight pleomorphism of individual cells
- Nuclear atypia with prominent nucleoli
- High rates of mitotic activity (however, some benign nevi also exhibit this trait)
- Penetration through lower tissue layers

Additionally, dermatoscopy may reveal discoloration, border irregularities, and other patterns typical of other kinds of melanoma, but which are too small or subtle to be seen with the naked eye.

In some cases, it may be difficult to identify these features even with a dermatoscope. This is because some nevoid melanomas preserve normal layers of epidermis above them. Excision and biopsy of the suspected lesion can identify nesting, atypical growth patterns, and other hallmarks of malignant growth. In particular, patterns of confluence among melanocytes, parallel arrays of nested cells (parallel theque pattern), and a lack of connective tissue in the lesion should strongly increase suspicion of a nevoid melanoma.

== Treatment ==
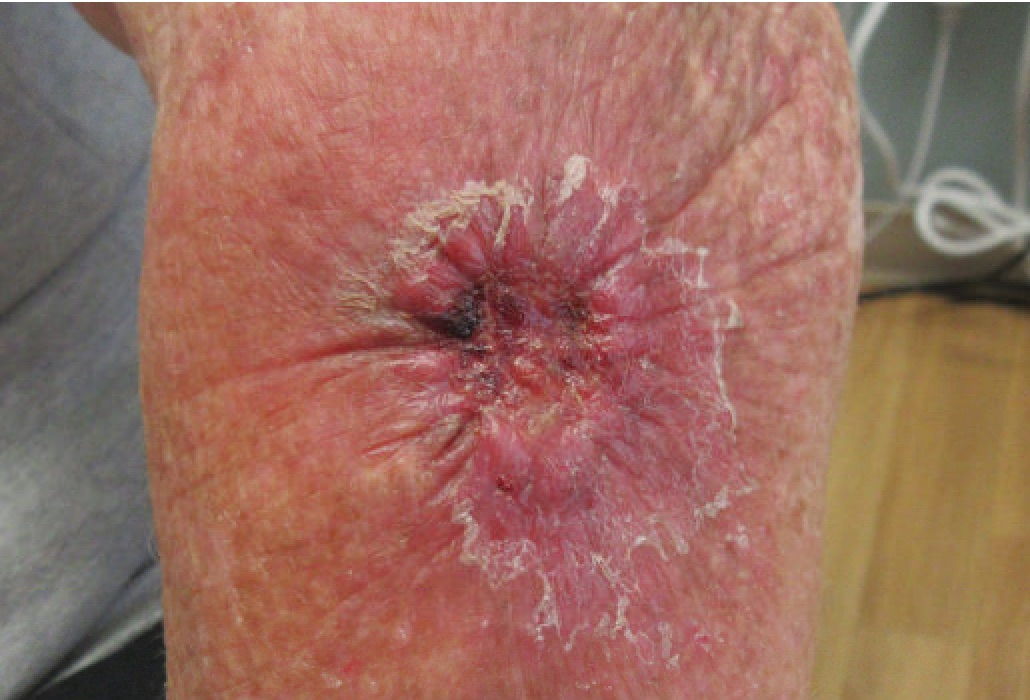
A forearm after removal of a large melanoma.

Treatment of a nevoid melanoma typically focuses on surgical removal of the primary lesion. Adjunct chemotherapy, radiotherapy, and other cancer treatments may occur, as with any type of melanoma. One important distinction is that a nevoid melanoma is never considered to be "in-situ" when treating a patient.

== Complications ==
Nevoid melanomas progress at the same rate as other types of melanoma. In many cases, the primary tumor may have a small radius while already penetrating deep into the tissue. When cancer cells reach blood vessels or lymphatic ducts, they may use them to travel to other parts of the body, causing a disseminated cancer that ultimately leads to death.

== Epidemiology ==
Estimates of the prevalence of nevoid melanoma range from less than 1% to as much as 3% of all cases of melanoma.

== See also ==
- Melanoma
- List of cutaneous conditions
