= Anaplasia =

Very poor cellular differentiation, indicative of potential for cancer

Anaplasia (from Ancient Greek ἀνά (ana) 'backward' and πλάσις (plasis) 'formation') is a condition of cells with poor cellular differentiation, losing the morphological characteristics of mature cells and their orientation with respect to each other and to endothelial cells. The term also refers to a group of morphological changes in a cell (nuclear pleomorphism, altered nuclear-cytoplasmic ratio, presence of nucleoli, high proliferation index) that point to a possible malignant transformation.

Such loss of structural differentiation is especially seen in most, but not all, malignant neoplasms. Sometimes, the term also includes an increased capacity for multiplication. Lack of differentiation is considered a hallmark of aggressive malignancies (for example, it differentiates leiomyosarcomas from leiomyomas). The term anaplasia literally means "to form backward". It implies dedifferentiation, or loss of structural and functional differentiation of normal cells. It is now known, however, that at least some cancers arise from stem cells in tissues; in these tumors failure of differentiation, rather than dedifferentiation of specialized cells, account for undifferentiated tumors.

Anaplastic cells display marked pleomorphism (variability). The nuclei are characteristically extremely hyperchromatic (darkly stained) and large. The nuclear-cytoplasmic ratio may approach 1:1 instead of the normal 1:4 or 1:6. Giant cells that are considerably larger than their neighbors may be formed and possess either one enormous nucleus or several nuclei (syncytia). Anaplastic nuclei are variable and bizarre in size and shape. The chromatin is coarse and clumped, and nucleoli may be of astounding size. More important, mitoses are often numerous and distinctly atypical; anarchic multiple spindles may be seen and sometimes appear as tripolar or quadripolar forms. Also, anaplastic cells usually fail to develop recognizable patterns of orientation to one another (i.e., they lose normal polarity). They may grow in sheets, with total loss of communal structures, such as gland formation or stratified squamous architecture. Anaplasia is the most extreme disturbance in cell growth encountered in the spectrum of cellular proliferations.

== See also ==
- Pleomorphism
- List of biological development disorders
