= Fumarase deficiency =

Rare disease

- Other names: Fumarate hydratase deficiency
- Fumarate is converted to malate by fumarase.
- Frequency: 0.0001%

Fumarase deficiency (or fumaric aciduria) is an exceedingly rare autosomal recessive metabolic disorder in the Krebs cycle, characterized by a deficiency of the enzyme fumarate hydratase, which causes a buildup of fumaric acid in the urine and a deficiency of malate. Only 13 cases were known worldwide in 1990, after which a cluster of 20 cases were documented in the Short Creek Community located in Arizona, US, that has practiced successive endogamy.

== Presentation ==
Fumarase deficiency causes encephalopathy, severe intellectual disabilities, unusual facial features, brain malformation, and epileptic seizures due to an abnormally low amount of fumarase in cells. It can initially present with polyhydramnios on prenatal ultrasound. Affected neonates may demonstrate nonspecific signs of poor feeding and hypotonia. Laboratory findings in neonates may indicate polycythemia, leukopenia, or neutropenia. As they age, neurological deficits begin to manifest with seizures, dystonias, and severe developmental delay. Affected individuals usually survive only a few months.

== Pathophysiology ==
Fumarase deficiency is caused by a mutation in the fumarate hydratase (FH) gene in humans, which encodes the enzyme that converts fumarate to malate in the mitochondria. Other mutant alleles of the FH gene, located on human chromosome 1 at position 1q42.1, cause multiple cutaneous and uterine leiomyomata, hereditary leiomyomatosis and renal cell cancer. Fumarase deficiency is one of the few known deficiencies of the Krebs cycle or tricarboxylic acid cycle, the main enzymatic pathway of cellular aerobic respiration.

Fumarase deficiency has an autosomal recessive pattern of inheritance.

The condition is an autosomal recessive disorder, and it is therefore usually necessary for an affected individual to receive the mutant allele from both parents. A number of children diagnosed with the disorder have been born to parents who were first cousins. It can also be associated with uniparental isodisomy.

== Treatment ==
There is no disease-modifying treatment available. Treatment therefore focuses on managing symptoms. Feeding may be aided by a gastrostomy. Physical therapy may be useful to aid mobility and control scoliosis.

== Epidemiology ==
Fumarase deficiency is extremely rare – until around 1990 there had only been 13 diagnosed and identified cases worldwide.

A cluster of 20 cases has since been documented in the twin towns of Colorado City, Arizona, and Hildale, Utah, both of which were formerly known as "Short Creek" (or the Short Creek Community). The two towns combine to form a community of 10,000 members of the Fundamentalist Church of Jesus Christ of Latter Day Saints (FLDS) who have a history of practicing successive endogamy, or marriage within their own communities. Nicknamed "Polygamist's Down's", the syndrome has been blamed on cousin marriage, but in a larger sense is related to the reproductive isolation of a community among whom 85% are blood relatives of John Y. Barlow and/or Joseph Smith Jessop (the cofounders of the Short Creek Community).

Since the initial cluster from FLDS communities was reported, it is now estimated that there are 100 documented cases worldwide.

== See also ==
- Hereditary leiomyomatosis and renal cell cancer
- Founder effect
