= Pleomorphism =

Pleomorphism may refer to:

- Pleomorphism (cytology), variability in the size and shape of cells and/or their nuclei
- Pleomorphism (microbiology), the ability of some bacteria to alter their shape or size in response to environmental conditions
- A life cycle of certain fungi where different stages have different morphology, see Teleomorph, anamorph and holomorph
