= Piloleiomyoma =

Skin condition

Piloleiomyoma is a cutaneous condition that presents as a dermal reddish-brown, pink or skin-colored papule or nodule that can be solitary or multiple. They can be very painful, often sensitive to cold and/or touch. They are rare and easily overlooked by doctors because of the small size. It can be due to a defect in the fumarate hydratase gene, which can also be responsible for a hereditary type of cancer of the kidneys. This is more likely the case when there are also myomas in the uterus.

== See also ==
- Palisaded encapsulated neuroma
- List of cutaneous conditions
