= Hereditary leiomyomatosis and renal cell cancer syndrome =

Reed's syndrome
- Other names: Familial leiomyomatosis cutis et uteri
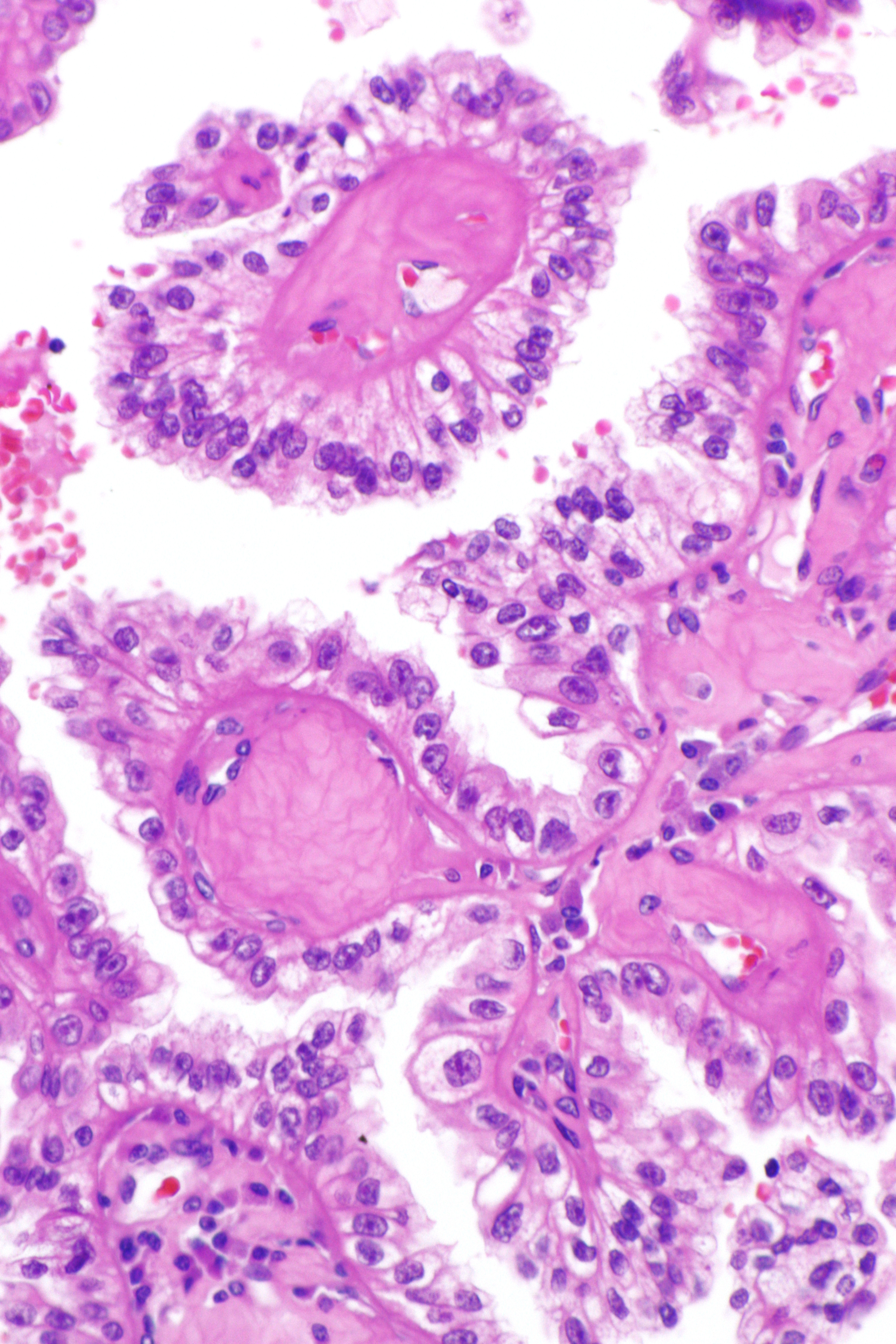
- Micrograph showing the characteristic hyalinized papillary cores found in some hereditary leiomyomatosis and renal cell carcinoma syndrome-associated renal cell carcinomas. H&E stain.

Hereditary leiomyomatosis and renal cell carcinoma (HLRCC) or Reed's syndrome is rare autosomal dominant disorder associated with benign smooth muscle tumors and an increased risk of renal cell carcinoma. It is characterised by multiple cutaneous leiomyomas and, in women, uterine leiomyomas. It predisposes individuals to renal cell cancer, an association denominated hereditary leiomyomatosis and renal cell cancer. It is also associated with increased risk of uterine leiomyosarcoma. The syndrome is caused by a mutation in the fumarate hydratase gene, which leads to an accumulation of fumarate. The inheritance pattern is autosomal dominant and screening can typically begin in childhood.

== Signs and symptoms ==
Almost all women present with uterine fibroids, approximately 76% with dermal manifestations and 10–16% with renal tumors.

The uterine fibroids tend to occur at younger age and are larger and more numerous than in the general population. They may be distinguishable from sporadic fibroids by special histological features such as prominent nucleoli with perinucleolar halos.

The skin presentation is of asymmetrical, reddish-brown nodules or papules with a firm consistency, predominantly located on the limbs (multiple cutaneous leiomyoma), although they may occur anywhere, including the face. The lesions, which are typically painful and most often present during the third decade of life, are piloleiomyomata—a benign smooth muscle tumour arising from the arrectores pilorum muscles of the skin. These tumours may also arise in the tunica dartos of the scrotum and the mammillary muscle of the nipple (genital leiomyoma), the smooth muscle of blood vessels (angioleiomyoma) and the lung (pulmonary lymphangioleiomyomatosis). A pseudo-Darier sign may be present.

The renal cell carcinoma tends to be of the papillary (type 2) form and tends to occur more commonly in women than men with this syndrome. These cancers present earlier than is usual for renal cell carcinomas (typically in the twenties and thirties) and tend to be at relatively advanced stages at presentation. Tumours have rarely been reported in children. These tumours occur in ~20% of those with this mutation suggesting that other factors are involved in the pathogenesis.

These growths increase in size and number throughout the lifetime. People with HLRCC have an approximately 15% chance of developing renal cell carcinoma in their lifetime. This is most commonly type II papillary renal cell carcinoma, which is an aggressive form.

=== Associated conditions ===
Other relatively rare conditions have been reported in association with this disease. It is not yet known if these associations are fortuitous or manifestations of the condition itself.

Cerebral cavernomas and massive, macronodular adrenocortical disease have also been reported in association with this syndrome. A case of cutis verticis gyrata, disseminated collagenoma and Charcot–Marie–Tooth disease in association with a mutation in the fumarate hydratase gene has also been reported. Two cases of ovarian mucinous cystadenoma have also been reported with this mutation.

== Cause ==
HLRCC is an autosomal dominant condition caused by a mutation in the FH gene, which results in dysfunction of the citric acid cycle, leading to an accumulation of fumarate.

The fumarate hydratase gene is located on the long arm of chromosome 1 (1q42.3-43), spans 22 kilobases and has 10 exons; the first exon codes for a signal peptide.

== Pathogenesis ==
While the pathogenetic mechanisms underlying the lesions remain unclear, it has been suggested that the accumulation of fumarate may lead to overexpression of the aldo-keto reductase enzyme, AKR1B10. It has also been found that fumarate is present in the mitochondria and in the cytoplasm. The cytoplasmic form appears to have a role in the protection of DNA from molecular injury. Fumarate has been shown to be a competitive inhibitor of prolyl hydroxylase. This inhibition leads to the stabilisation of a number of hypoxia-inducible factors which are thought to predispose to tumorigenesis. An alternative pathway for the metabolism of fumarate in the presence of these mutations has been described. Other genes involved affected by this mutation are Keap1, Nrf2 and HMOX1.

== Diagnosis ==
The diagnosis is made either by testing of the fumarate hydratase activity in cultured skin fibroblasts or lymphoblastoid cells and demonstrating reduced activity (≤60%) or by molecular genetic testing. Special histologic features of fibroids may allow an early diagnosis in absence of other symptoms.

=== Histology ===
The skin lesions may be difficult to diagnose clinically but a punch biopsy will usually reveal a Grenz zone separating the tumour from the overlying skin. Histological examination shows dense dermal nodules composed of elongated cells with abundant eosinophilic cytoplasm arranged in fascicles (spindle cells). The nuclei are uniform, blunt-ended and cigar-shaped with only occasional mitoses. Special stains that may be of use in the diagnosis include Masson's trichrome, Van Gieson's stain and phosphotungstic acid–haematoxylin.

The renal cell carcinomas have prominent eosinophilic nucleoli surrounded by a clear halo.

=== Differential diagnosis ===
Differential diagnosis of this condition includes the Birt–Hogg–Dubé syndrome and tuberous sclerosis. As the skin lesions are typically painful, it is also often necessary to exclude other painful tumors of the skin (including blue rubber bleb nevus, leiomyoma, eccrine spiradenoma, neuroma, dermatofibroma, angiolipoma, neurilemmoma, endometrioma, glomus tumor and granular cell tumor; the mnemonic "BLEND-AN-EGG" may be helpful). Other skin lesions that may need to be considered include cylindroma, lipoma, poroma and trichoepithelioma; these tend to be painless and have other useful distinguishing features.

== Treatment ==
Leiomyomas do not typically require treatment unless they cause pain. The skin lesions may be difficult to treat as they tend to recur after excision or destructive treatment. Drugs which affect smooth muscle contraction, such as doxazosin, nitroglycerine, nifedipine and phenoxybenzamine, may provide pain relief.

Uterine fibroids can be treated with the same methods as sporadic uterine fibroids including anti-hormonal treatment, surgery, or embolisation. Substantially elevated risk of progression to or independent development of uterine leiomyosarcoma has been reported which may influence treatment methods.

The predisposition to renal cell cancer calls for screening and, if necessary, urological management.

Topical lidocaine patches have been reported to decrease the severity and frequency of pain associated with cutaneous leiomyomas.

== Prognosis ==
A 2006 review stated that Reed's Syndrome often is the leading cause of renal cancer between ages 30–50. Renal cancer kills about 1 in 3 people, but 5-year survival rates improved between 1974–1976 and 1995–2000, from 52% to 64%.

== History ==
The syndrome was first described by Reed et al in 1973. The link with the fumarate hydratase gene was uncovered in 2002.

== Epidemiology ==
HLRCC affects males and females equally. Thus far, HLRCC has been found in 300 families worldwide.

== Notes ==
A database of the mutations of the fumarate hydratase gene is available. Autosomal recessive mutations cause a serious neurological disease known as fumarase deficiency, which is associated with a variety of congenital lesions in the brain.

== See also ==
- Von Hippel–Lindau disease
- Birt-Hogg-Dube syndrome
