= Angiolipoleiomyoma =

- Specialty: Dermatology

Angiolipoleiomyoma is solitary, asymptomatic acral nodule, characterized histologically by well-circumscribed subcutaneous tumors composed of smooth muscle cells, blood vessels, connective tissue, and fat.

== See also ==
- Leiomyoma
- List of cutaneous conditions
