= Javier Arias Stella =

Peruvian pathologist (1924–2020)

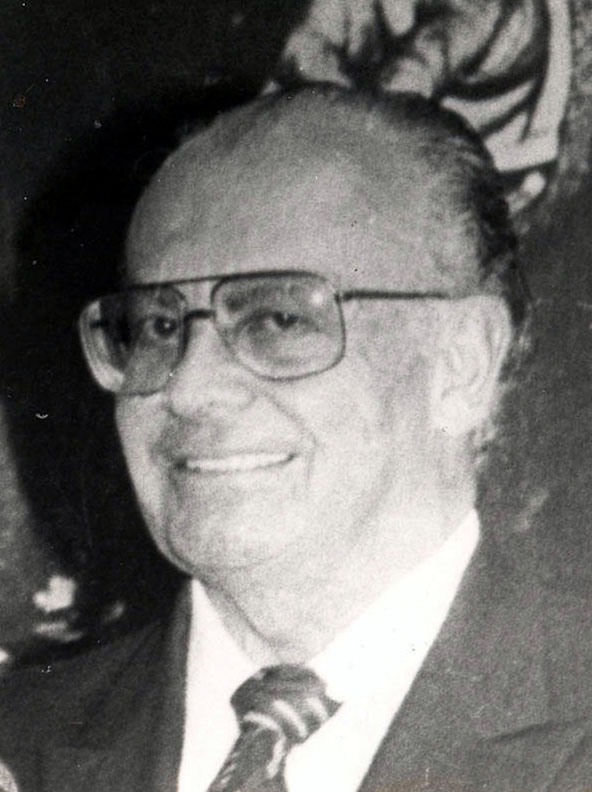

President of the United Nations Security Council
- In office 1 April 1985 – 30 April 1985
- Preceded by: Blaise Rabetafika
- Succeeded by: Birabhongse Kasemsri; Siddhi Savetsila
- In office 1 March 1984 – 31 March 1984
- Preceded by: S. Shah Nawaz
- Succeeded by: Volodymyr O. Kravets

Minister of Foreign Relations of Peru
- In office 1980–1983
- President: Fernando Belaúnde Terry

Minister of Public Health of Peru
- In office 1967–1968
- President: Fernando Belaúnde Terry
- In office 1963–1965
- President: Fernando Belaúnde Terry

Javier Arias Stella (August 2, 1924 – February 25, 2020) was a Peruvian pathologist, politician, diplomat, academic, and lecturer who variously served as Minister of Public Health of Peru (1963-1965, 1967-1968), Minister of Foreign Relations of Peru (1980-1983), and President of the United Nations Security Council (March 1984, April 1985), the former two positions having been served under Peruvian president Fernando Belaúnde Terry. He was best known in medical circles for having discovered the eponymously-named Arias-Stella reaction.

== Education ==
Arias Stella's undergraduate studies were done first at the San Marcos National University's School of Science in Peru from 1942 to 1944 and then at the Faculty of Medicine from 1945 to 1951, from which he earned his bachelor's in 1951. His doctorate was also earned from that faculty in 1959.

== Research ==
=== Arias-Stella reaction ===
Arias Stella found that a reaction previously thought of as a cancer in the endometrium was rather a normal reaction of hormones from placental tissue. It can also refer to changes occurring in the cervix.

=== Altitude changes in anatomy and histology ===
Later in his life, he became involved in researching how altitude changes in the Andes affected anatomy and histology in human beings, men specifically. It had long been thought that the multiple cases of pulmonary hypertension in Andes men came from the altitude they lived in. Arias Stella's research showed that "hypoxia-induced thickening of the pulmonary arteriolar walls" was the main cause for the hypertension. Considering that the natives had no access to vasodilators, their cases of hypertension were found to be different from known cases of acute hypoxic pulmonary vasoconstriction.

== Career ==
=== Early career ===
Arias Stella began teaching as an instructor in pathology by 1949 in the same university and faculty that he already was attending. Over time he became a senior lecturer in clinical pathology. In 1961, he co-founded the Universidad Peruana Cayetano Heredia, where he began as an associate professor of pathology. By 1969, he was the principal professor and then head of the pathology department by 1975. He became the consulting professor for the National University of Caracas in 1974 and then the same for the Central University of Venezuela in 1975. He continued to have various professional standings in many hospitals in both South America and the United States. He also traveled as a visiting professor to many universities in the United States.

He was asked to join multiple medical societies, including the American Association of Pathologists and the International Academy of Pathologists then went on to found the International Society of Gynecological Pathology, the Latin American Society of Pathology, and the Peruvian Society of Pathology.

=== Political career ===
Arias Stella was public health minister in 1963–65 and 1967–68 and became the foreign minister of Peru from 1980 to 1983 because of his involvement in the Belaunde regime. Arias Stella was the foreign minister during the Paquisha War in 1981 with Ecuador. During the early skirmishes over an outpost in Paquisha, he was quoted in newspapers as stating that Peru would proceed to recapture the rest of the territory that Ecuadorian forces were encroaching on.

From 1983 to 1985, Arias served as the Permanent Representative of Peru to the United Nations. In 1984 and 1985, Arias Stella served as the President of the United Nations Security Council.

== Personal life ==
He married Nancy Castillo Arias Stella and had four children. Arias Stella died on February 25, 2020, at the age of 95.

== See also ==
- Ministry of Foreign Relations (Peru)
