= Nuclear–cytoplasmic ratio =

Measurement used in cell biology

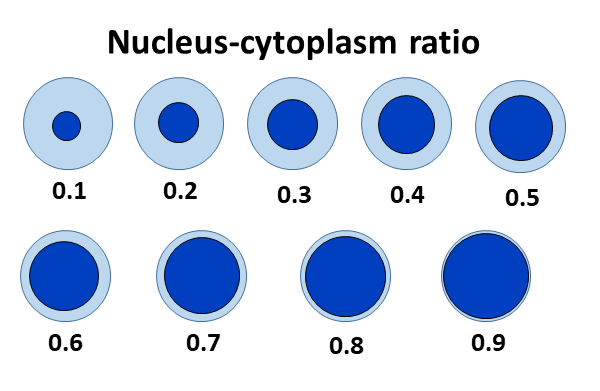
Nuclear–cytoplasmic ratios.

The nuclear–cytoplasmic ratio (also variously known as the nucleus:cytoplasm ratio, nucleus–cytoplasm ratio, N:C ratio, or N/C) is a measurement used in cell biology. It is a ratio of the size (i.e., volume) of the nucleus of a cell to the size of the cytoplasm of that cell.

The N:C ratio indicates the maturity of a cell, because as a cell matures the size of its nucleus generally decreases. For example, "blast" forms of erythrocytes, leukocytes, and megakaryocytes start with an N:C ratio of 4:1, which decreases as they mature to 2:1 or even 1:1 (with exceptions for mature thrombocytes and erythrocytes, which are anuclear cells, and mature lymphocytes, which only decrease to a 3:1 ratio and often retain the original 4:1 ratio).

An increased N:C ratio is commonly associated with precancerous dysplasia as well as with malignant cells.

== See also ==
- Cell growth § Yeast cell size regulation
- Cytopathology
- Nuclear atypia
- Nuclear pleomorphism
