= Elagolix/estradiol/norethisterone acetate =

Combination drug

Combination of
- Elagolix: Gonadotropin-releasing hormone receptor antagonist
- Estradiol: Estrogen
- Norethisterone acetate: Progestin

Clinical data
- Trade names: Oriahnn, others
- AHFS/Drugs.com: Monograph
- MedlinePlus: a620042
- License data: US DailyMed: Oriahnn
- Routes of administration: By mouth
- ATC code: H01CC53 (WHO)

Legal status
- Legal status: US: ℞-only

Identifiers
- KEGG: D12137

Elagolix/estradiol/norethisterone acetate, sold under the brand name Oriahnn among others, is a fixed-dose combination medication used to treat heavy menstrual bleeding associated with uterine leiomyomas (fibroids) in premenopausal women. It contains elagolix, a gonadotropin-releasing hormone (GnRH) receptor antagonist, estradiol, an estrogen, and norethisterone acetate, a progestin. It is taken by mouth. Oriahnn is co-packaged as a combination of elagolix/estradiol/norethisterone acetate capsules with elagolix capsules.

The most common side effects include hot flushes (sudden feelings of warmth), headache, fatigue and irregular vaginal bleeding.

== Medical uses ==
Fibroids are benign (non-cancerous) muscle tumors of the uterus that can cause heavy menstrual bleeding, pain, bowel or bladder problems and infertility. Some women may not experience any symptoms, but many do, including heavy bleeding with periods. Fibroids can occur at any age but are most common in women 35 to 49 years of age. They typically resolve after menopause but are a leading reason for hysterectomy (surgical removal of the uterus) in the United States when they cause severe symptoms.

Elagolix/estradiol/norethisterone acetate is indicated for the management of heavy menstrual bleeding associated with uterine leiomyomas (fibroids) in premenopausal women.

== Adverse effects ==
Elagolix/estradiol/norethisterone acetate may cause bone loss over time, and the loss in some women may not be completely recovered after stopping treatment. Because bone loss may increase the risk for fractures, women should not take elagolix/estradiol/norethisterone acetate for more than 24 months.

The drug label for the combination includes a boxed warning about the risk of vascular events (strokes) and thrombotic or thromboembolic disorders (blood clots), especially in women at increased risk for these events.

== History ==
Elagolix/estradiol/norethisterone acetate was approved for medical use in the United States in May 2020.

The efficacy of elagolix/estradiol/norethisterone acetate was established in two clinical trials in which a total of 591 premenopausal women with heavy menstrual bleeding received the drug or placebo for six months. Heavy menstrual bleeding at baseline was defined as having at least two menstrual cycles with greater than 80 mL (about a third of a cup) of menstrual blood loss (MBL). The primary endpoint was the proportion of women who achieved MBL volume less than 80 mL at the final month and 50% or greater reduction in MBL volume from the start of the study (baseline) to the final month. In the first study, 68.5% of participants who received elagolix/estradiol/norethisterone acetate achieved this endpoint (compared to 8.7% of participants who received placebo). In the second study, 76.5% of participants who received elagolix/estradiol/norethisterone acetate achieved this endpoint (compared to 10.5% of participants who received placebo).

The approval of Oriahnn was granted to AbbVie Inc.
