= Smooth muscle tumour =

Tumor originating in smooth muscle

Smooth muscle tumours show a smooth muscle differentiation. There are two main types of smooth muscle tumour: the benign leiomyoma and the malignant leiomyosarcoma.
