= Arias-Stella reaction =

Changes in endometrium in response to progesterone

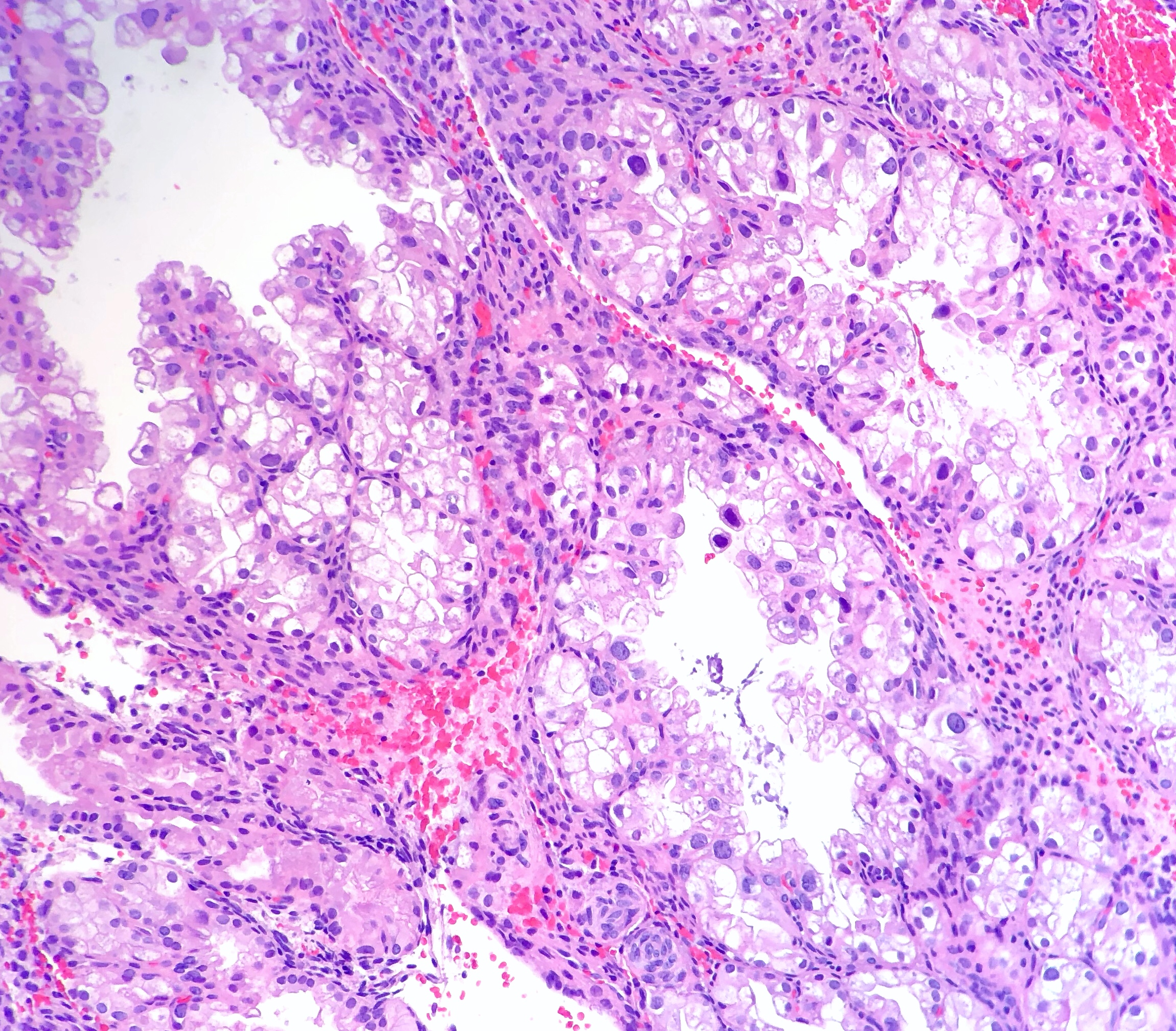
Micrograph showing Arias-Stella reaction in endometrium

Arias-Stella reaction, also Arias-Stella phenomenon, is a benign change in the endometrium associated with the presence of chorionic tissue.

Arias-Stella reaction is due to progesterone primarily. Cytologically, it resembles a malignancy and, historically, it was misdiagnosed as endometrial cancer.

== Significance ==
It is significant only because it can be misdiagnosed as a cancer. It may be seen in a completely normal pregnancy.

== Diagnosis ==
It is characterized by nuclear enlargement and may also have any of the following: an irregular nuclear membrane, granular chromatin, centronuclear vacuolization, and pseudonuclear inclusions.

Five subtypes are recognized:

1. Minimal atypia.
2. Early secretory pattern.
3. Secretory or hypersecretory pattern.
4. Regenerative, proliferative or nonsecretory pattern.
5. Monstrous cell pattern.

== History ==
It was first described by Javier Arias Stella, a Peruvian pathologist, in 1954.

== See also ==
- Choriocarcinoma
- Chorioangioma
- Herpes
- Nuclear atypia
- Nuclear pleomorphism
- Molar pregnancy
