= Leiomyoma =

Benign tumor of smooth muscle

- Other names: leiomyomas, leiomyomata
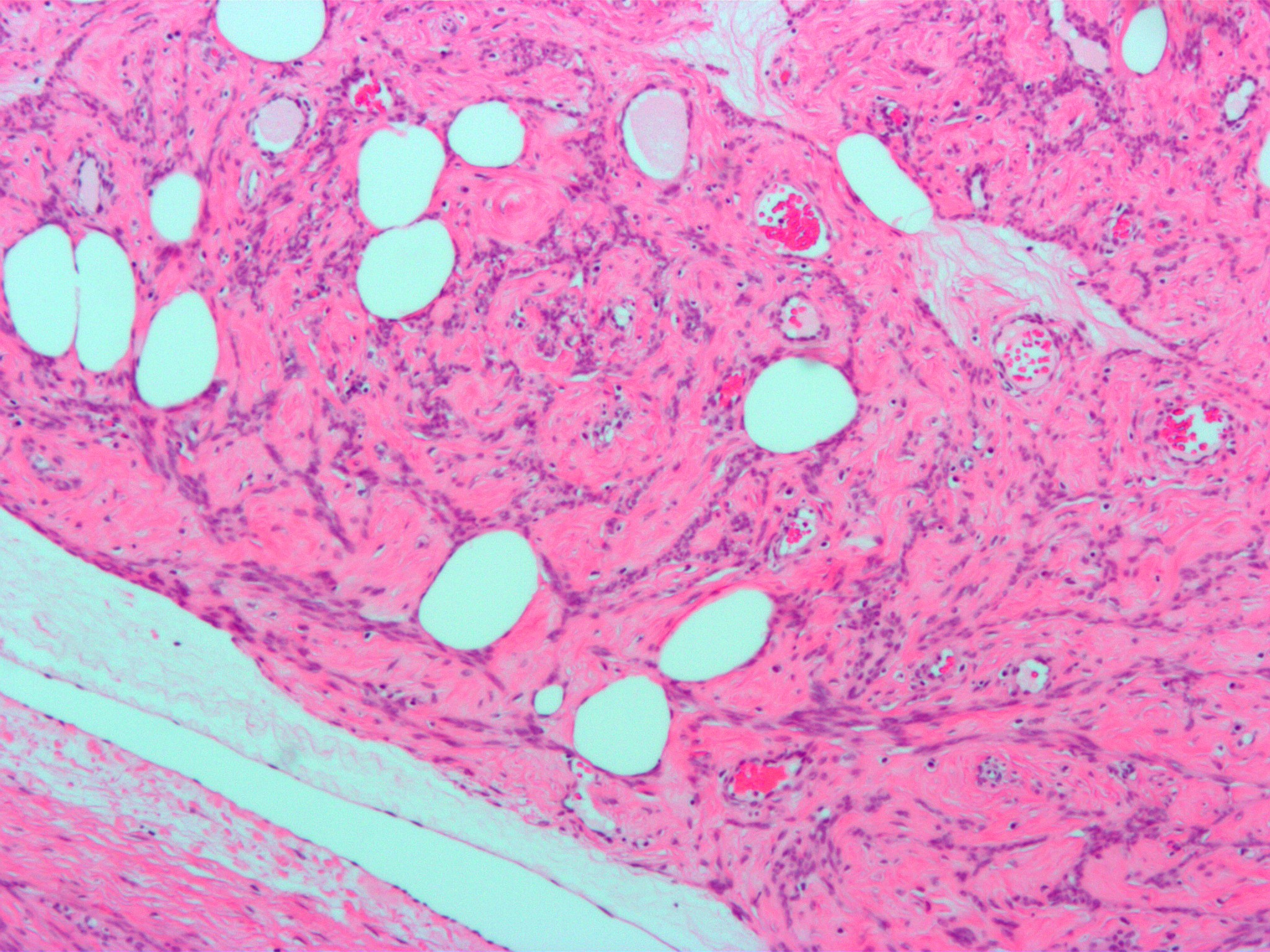
- Uterine lipoleiomyoma, a type of leiomyoma. H&E stain.
- Specialty: Oncology

A leiomyoma, also known as a fibroid, is a benign smooth muscle tumor that very rarely becomes cancer (0.1%). They can occur in any organ, but the most common forms occur in the uterus, small bowel, and the esophagus. Polycythemia may occur due to increased erythropoietin production as part of a paraneoplastic syndrome.

The word is from leio- + myo- + -oma, 'smooth-muscle tumor'. The plural form can be either the English leiomyomas or the classical leiomyomata.

== Uterus ==
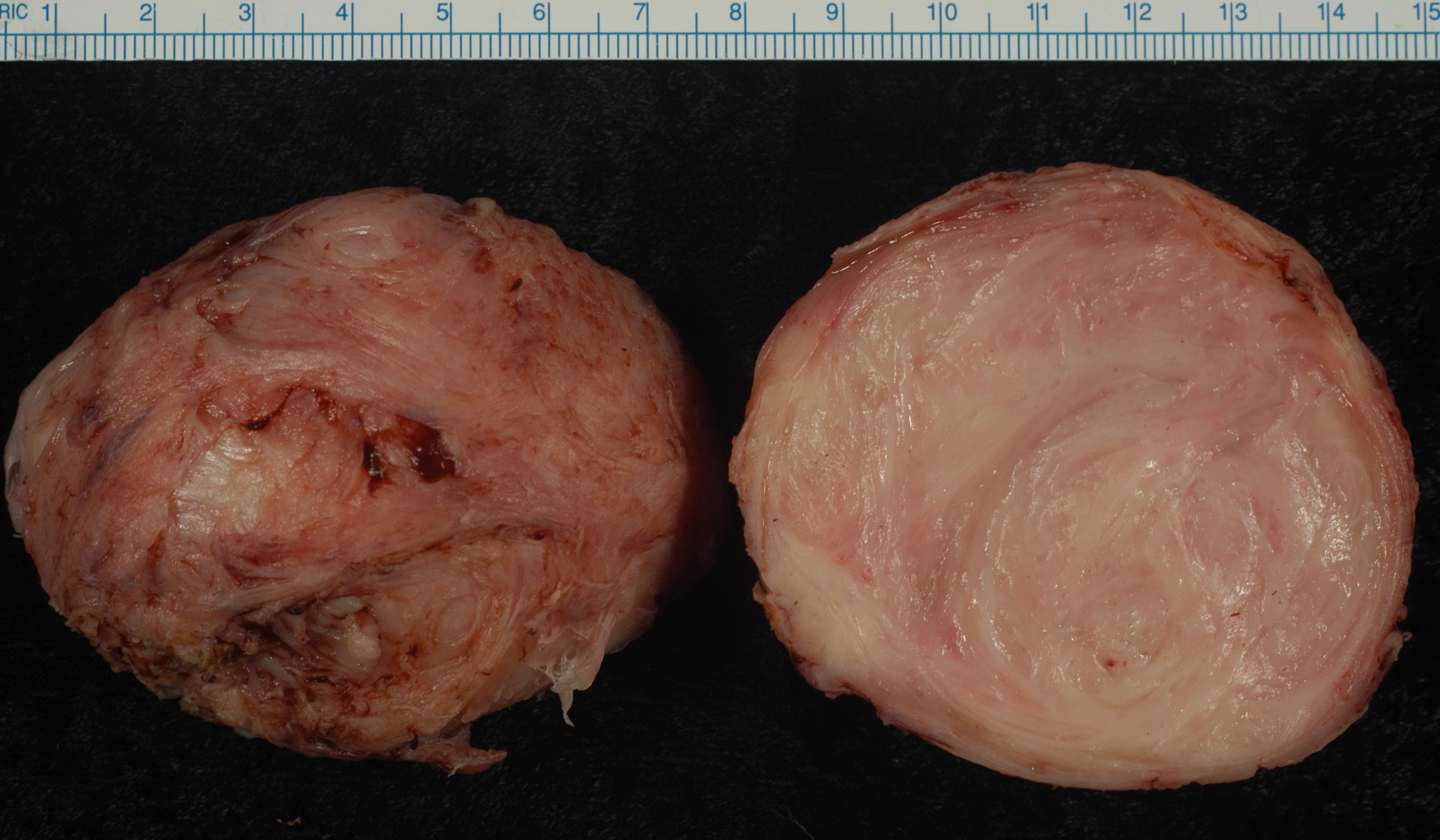
Leiomyoma enucleated from a uterus. External surface on left; cut surface on right.

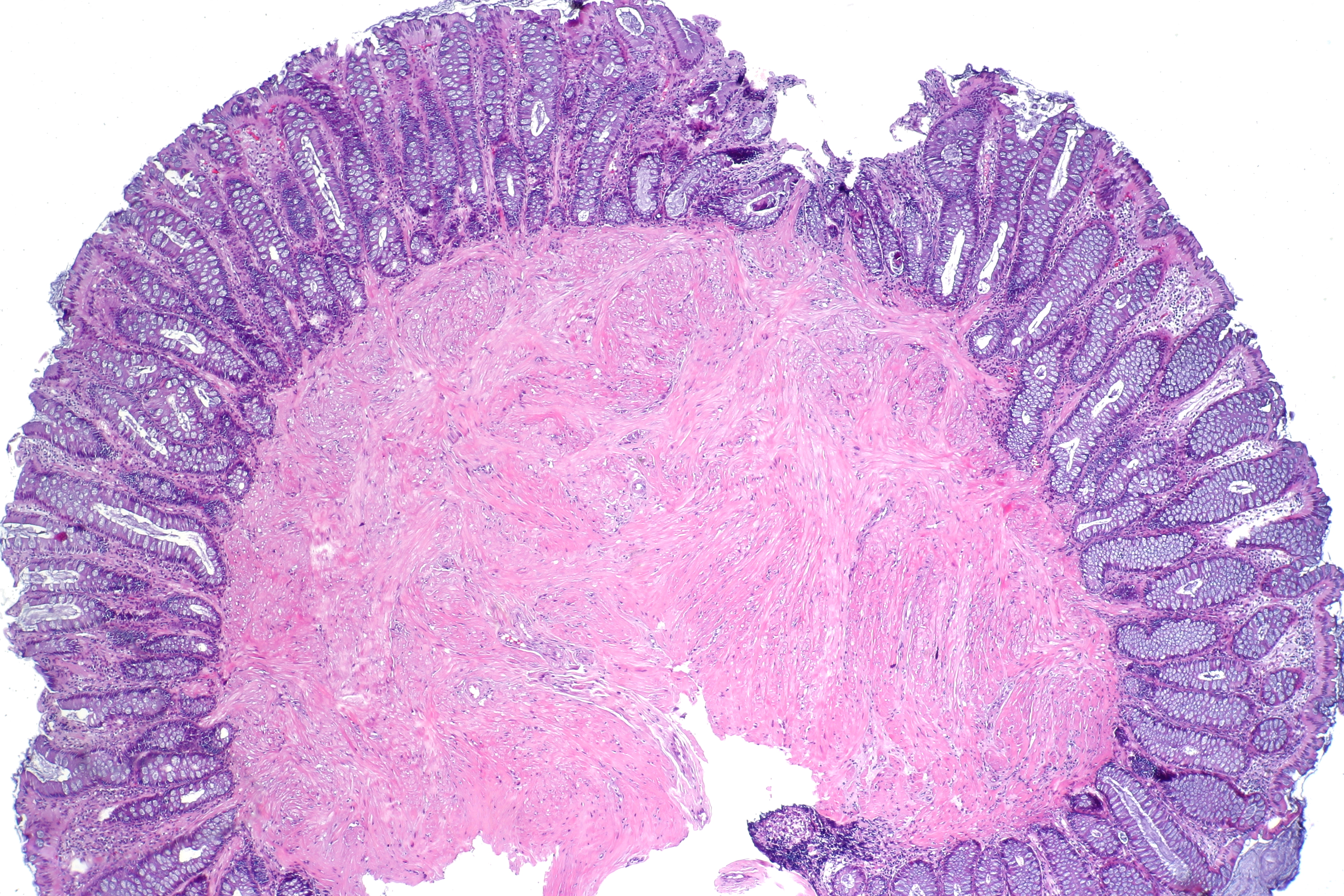
Micrograph of a small, well-circumscribed colonic leiomyoma arising from the muscularis mucosae and showing fascicles of spindle cells with eosinophilic cytoplasm and elongated, cigar-shaped nuclei

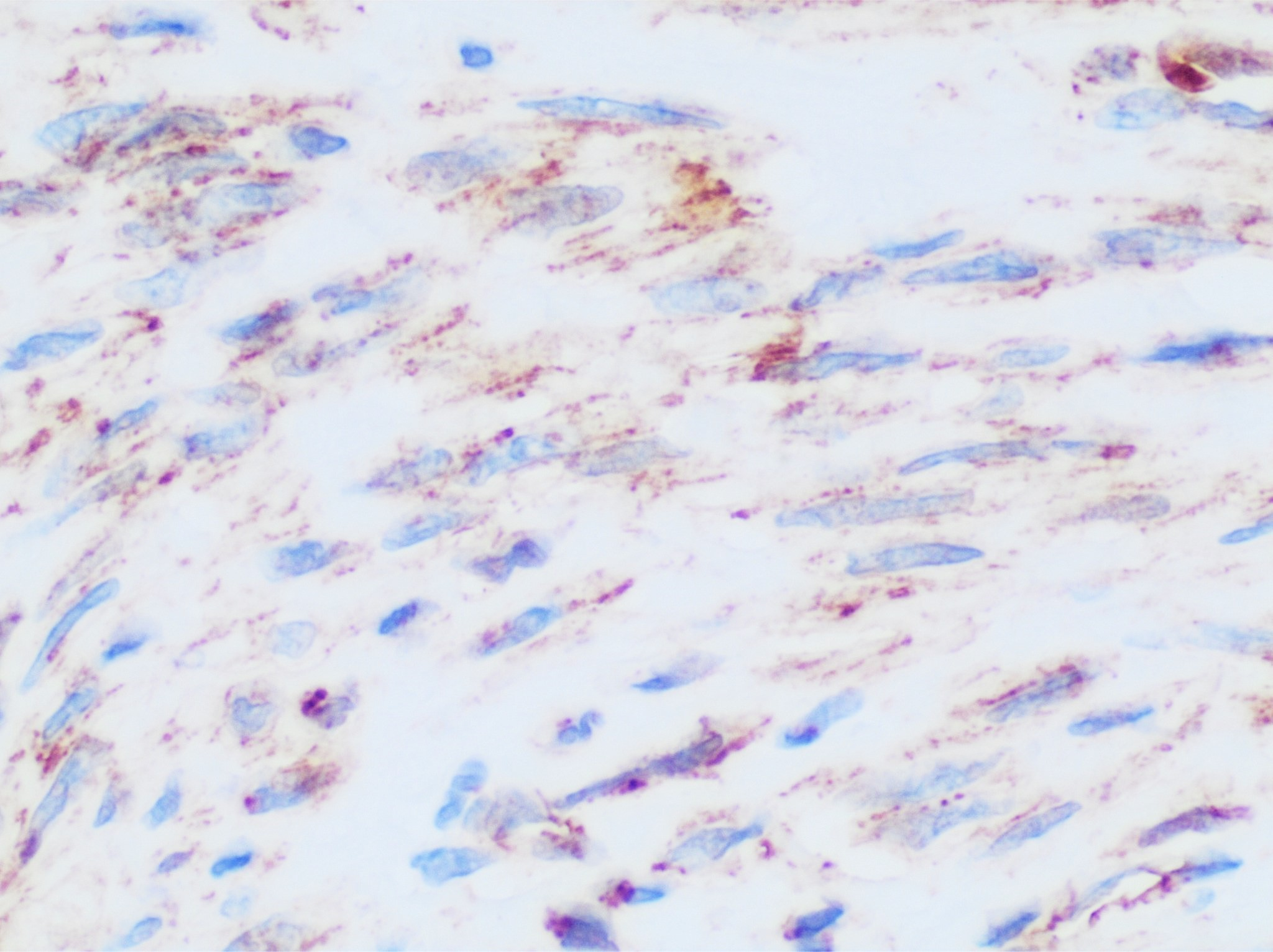
Immunohistochemistry for β-catenin in uterine leiomyoma, which is negative as there is only staining of cytoplasm but not of cell nuclei. This is a consistent finding, which helps in distinguishing such tumors from β-catenin positive spindle cell tumors.

Uterine fibroids are leiomyomata of the uterine smooth muscle. As other leiomyomata, they are benign, but may lead to excessive menstrual bleeding (menorrhagia), often cause anemia and may lead to infertility.

A rare form of these tumors is uterine lipoleiomyoma—benign tumors consisting of a mixture of adipocytes and smooth muscle cells. Uterine lipoleiomyomata have been observed together with ovarian and other pathologies and some of them may develop into liposarcoma. These tumors are monoclonal, and non-random chromosomal abnormalities have been seen in 40% of the tumors.

== Gallbladder ==
Mesenchymal neoplasms of the gallbladder are rare and in particular leiomyomas of the gallbladder have been rarely reported, all of them in patients with immune system disorders. However, a case was reported in absence of associated immunodeficiency at Monash Hospital in Melbourne, Australia, in a healthy 39-year-old woman with no symptoms.

== Skin ==
Leiomyomas of the skin are generally (1) acquired, and (2) divided into several categories:

- Solitary cutaneous leiomyoma
- Multiple cutaneous (or pilar) leiomyomas arising from the arrectores pilorum muscles
- Angioleiomyomas (vascular leiomyomas) that are thought to arise from vascular smooth muscle
- Dartoic (or genital) leiomyomas originating in the dartos muscles of the genitalia, areola, and nipple
- Angiolipoleiomyoma

== Esophagus, stomach and small intestines ==
Leiomyoma is the most common benign mesenchymal tumor of esophagus and second most common benign tumor of the small bowel (with gastrointestinal stromal tumor as most common). Although leiomyoma is the most common benign esophageal tumor, malignant carcinoma is still 50 times more likely. Approximately 50% of cases are found in the jejunum, followed by the ileum in 31% of cases. Almost one half of all lesions are less than 5 centimeters.

== Other locations, metastatic leiomyoma ==
- Metastatic leiomyoma are an extremely rare complication after surgery to remove the uterus for uterine fibroids. The most frequent sites of occurrence are the lungs and pelvis. The lesions are hormonally responsive.
- Fibromyoma of the breast is an extremely rare benign breast neoplasm. Most reports in literature mention a history of hysterectomy for uterine fibroids, although the question of whether these fibromyomas are possibly metastases of the uterine fibroids has not been investigated. An alternative hypothesis is an origin from the smooth muscle of the nipple.
- Leiomyoma may spontaneously occur in any muscle. Depending on the location of the tumor, identification may not be timely until overall mass becomes undeniably noticeable. The symptoms for a 30-year-old male with a 10 cm leiomyoma included "dead leg" pains. Tumor was intertwined with quadriceps muscles, making identification and excision difficult. Tumor was successfully excised with only minor rehabilitation required.

== Familial leiomyoma ==
- Associated with papillary variant of renal cell carcinoma and multiple cutaneous leiomyoma. Defect is in the fumarate hydratase gene in the long arm of chromosome 1.

== Pathologic findings ==
Leiomyomas are benign tumors but are sometimes observed to have low (but identifiable) levels of mitotic activity. Leiomyomas of the skin are associated with a form of nuclear atypia typically characterized by cigar-shaped nuclei with tapered ends.

== See also ==
- Leiomyosarcoma
- Elagolix/estradiol/norethindrone acetate
