= Nuclear atypia =

Abnormal appearance of cell nuclei

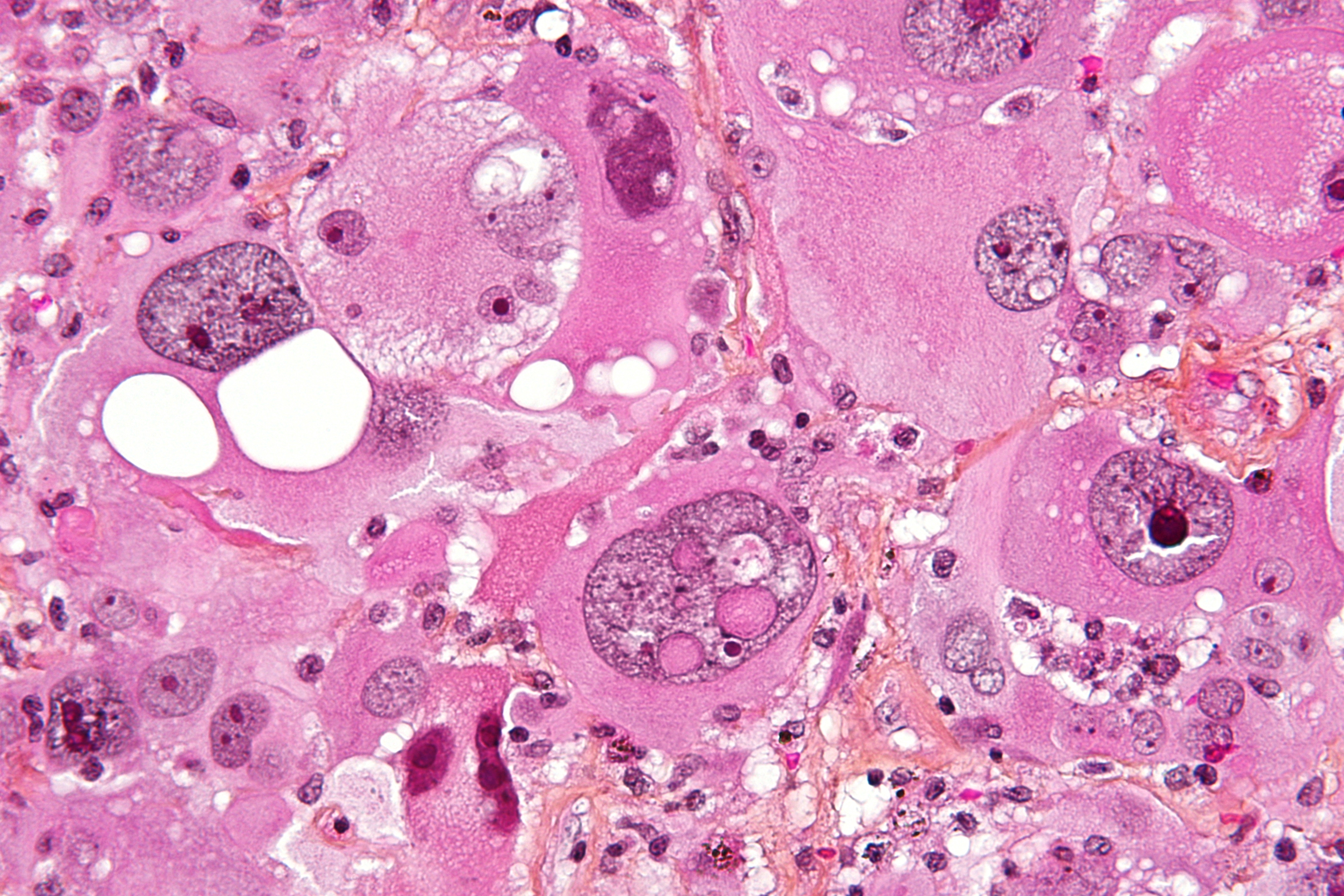
Micrograph showing extreme nuclear atypia in cancer (glioblastoma). Brain biopsy. HPS stain.

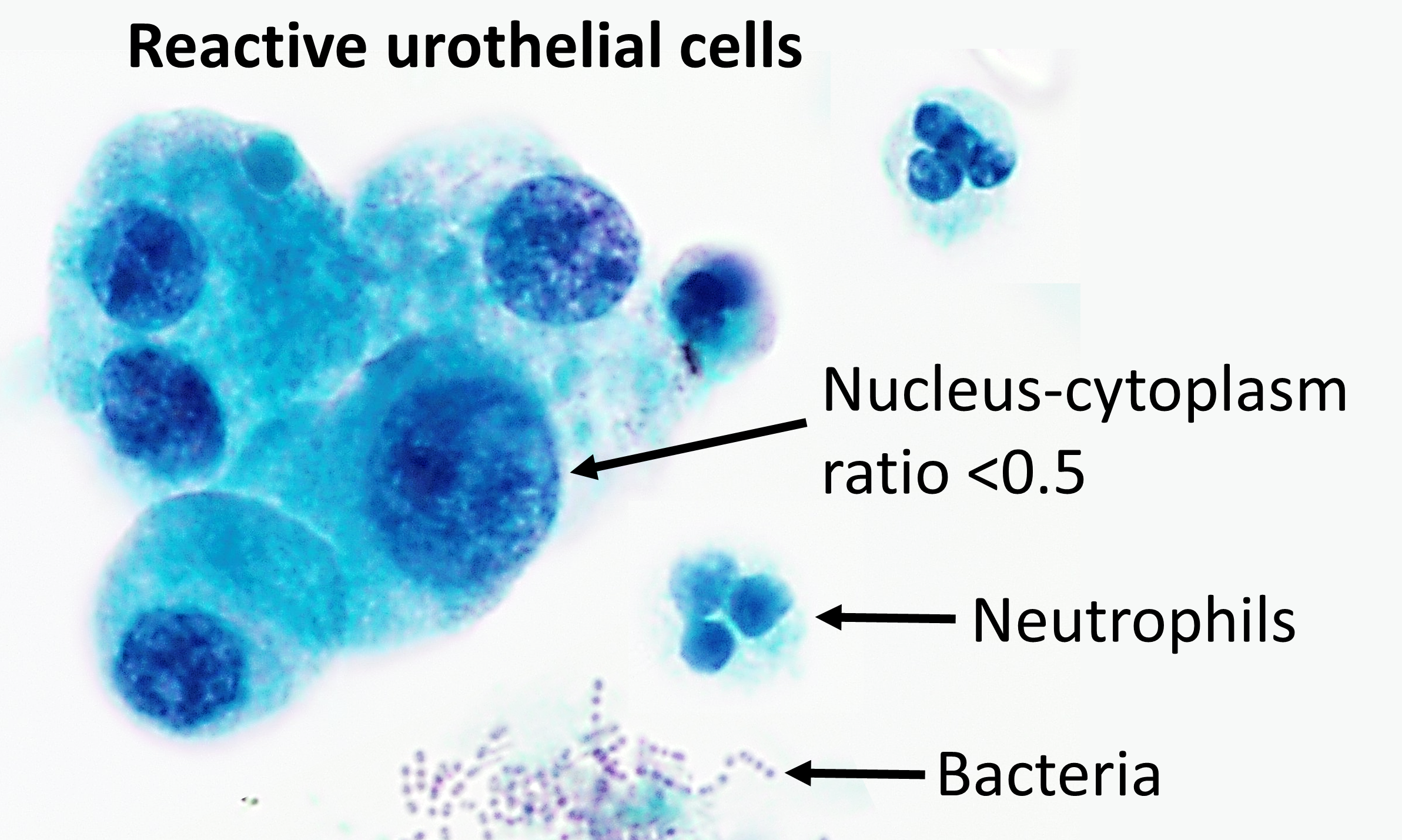
Cytopathology of reactive urothelial changes, Pap stain, showing urothelial cells with enlarged nuclei but a nucleus-cytoplasm ratio of less than 0.5. There are bacteria, as well as an inflammatory response of neutrophils, providing a cause for the changes.

Nuclear atypia refers to abnormal appearance of cell nuclei. It is a term used in cytopathology and histopathology. Atypical nuclei are often pleomorphic.

Nuclear atypia can be seen in reactive changes, pre-neoplastic changes, and malignancy. Severe nuclear atypia is, in most cases, considered an indicator of malignancy.

== See also ==
- Arias-Stella reaction
- NC ratio
- Nuclear pleomorphism
