= Genital leiomyoma =

Human disease

Genital leiomyomas (also known as dartoic leiomyomas) are leiomyomas that originate in the dartos muscles, or smooth muscles, of the genitalia, areola, and nipple. They are a subtype of cutaneous leiomyomas that affect smooth muscle found in the scrotum, labia, or nipple. They are benign tumors, but may cause pain and discomfort to patients. Genital leiomyoma can be symptomatic or asymptomatic and is dependent on the type of leiomyoma. In most cases, pain in the affected area or region is most common. For vaginal leiomyoma, vaginal bleeding and pain may occur. Uterine leiomyoma may exhibit pain in the area as well as painful bowel movement and/or sexual intercourse. Nipple pain, enlargement, and tenderness can be a symptom of nipple-areolar leiomyomas. Genital leiomyomas can be caused by multiple factors, one can be genetic mutations that affect hormones such as estrogen and progesterone. Moreover, risk factors to the development of genital leiomyomas include age, race, and gender. Ultrasound and imaging procedures are used to diagnose genital leiomyomas, while surgically removing the tumor is the most common treatment of these diseases. Case studies for nipple areolar, scrotal, and uterine leiomyoma were used, since there were not enough secondary resources to provide more evidence.

== Types of genital leiomyomas ==
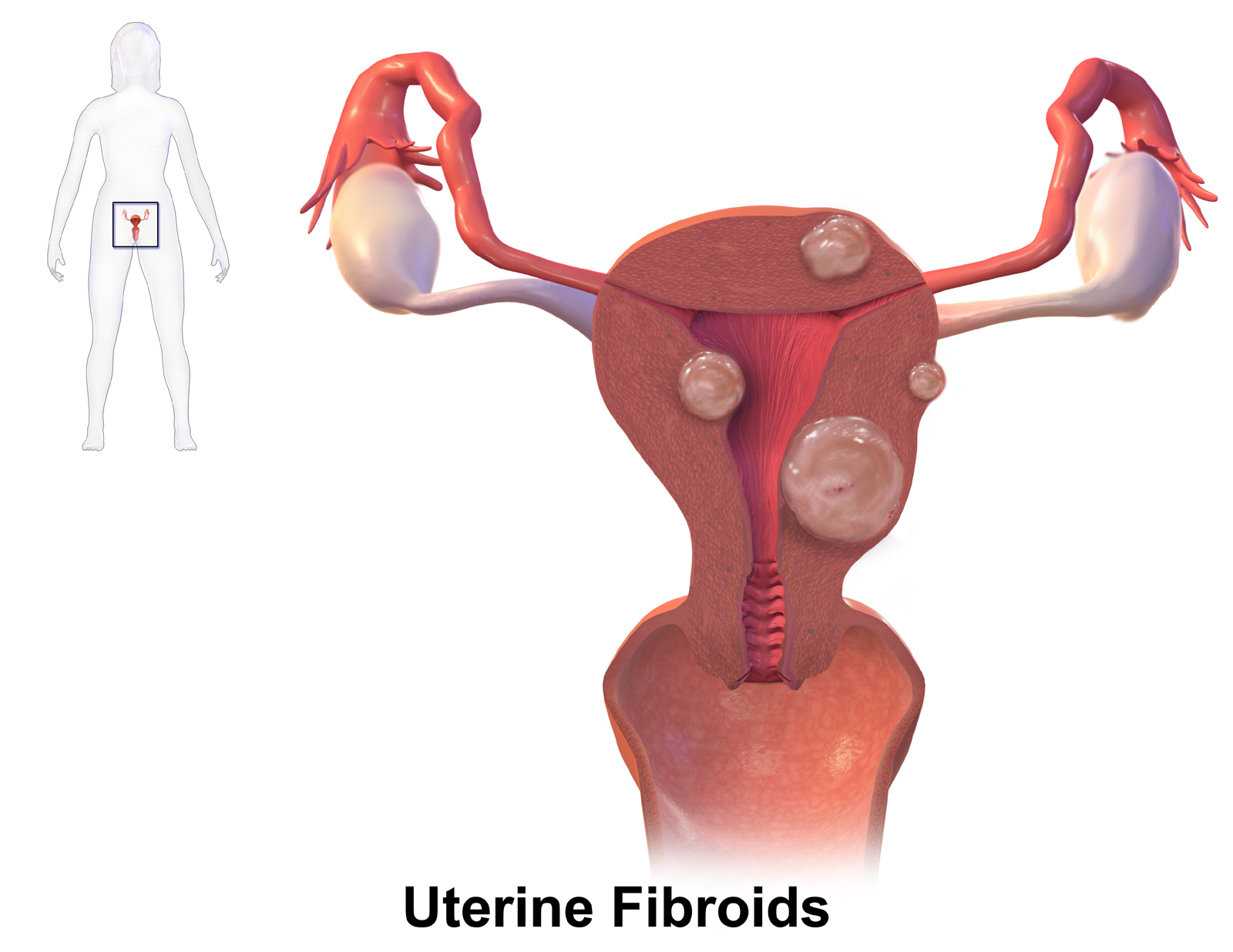
Uterine leiomyoma

=== Uterine ===
Uterine leiomyomas are benign tumors that affect 70% of European people with uteri and more than 80% African descent people with uteri by the time they turn 50 years of age. However, only 30% of people with uteri experience symptoms. Of those with uterine leiomyomas, 29% result in hospitalizations. One-third of patients with these fibroids experience life-threatening anemia, a condition where the body does not have enough oxygen due to lack of red blood cells to carry oxygen throughout the body. These tumors are mainly treated by performing hysterectomies, a procedure in which the uterus is removed, and account for approximately 40–60% of all performed hysterectomies. Symptoms are dependent on the location of the tumor, which may occur in the submucosal (under the mucous membranes and lines the inner part of some organs), intramural (within the walls of the organs), or subserosal areas (under the serosa and lines the outer part of some organs).

=== Nipple-areolar ===
Nipple-areolar leiomyoma is a rare type of genital leiomyoma. It presents as either unilateral or bilateral growth of benign tumor of the smooth muscle that can be painful, tender, and inflamed. They are typically less than 2 cm in length. Since this is an extremely rare tumor, with only 50 cases reported in literature, it is often only reported to physicians due to chronic nipple pain.

=== Vaginal ===
Vaginal paraurethral leiomyoma is another type of genital leiomyoma that is also less common compared to other types of leiomyoma. It presents as a benign tumor of the smooth muscle in the genitourinary tract, which includes urinary and genital organs, that can grow rapidly during pregnancy. On the other hand, the tumor tends to decrease in size upon menopause. This may be due to the growth of tumor that is dependent on hormones. There is not a definite cause for the development of the disease, but one hypothesis is that it originates from a blood vessel tissue and smooth muscle fiber residue in an embryo. Imaging and histopathological examination is used for diagnosis of the disease. Furthermore, treatment of the disease is to surgically remove the tumor.

Vulvar leiomyomas are one the most prominent types of genital leiomyomas. Lesions to the vulva may be up to 15 cm in length and they are reported to be acutely painful. Enlargement of these leiomyomas may occur during pregnancy.

=== Scrotal ===
Scrotal leiomyoma is considered to be an extremely rare type of genital leiomyoma. Because leiomyomas in the scrotum are usually painless and grow slowly over time, there is a delay in physician referral, with an average of 6–7 years. Physician referral usually occurs when people notice their testicles growing and getting heavier. A review of 11,000 cases of benign and malignant tumors of the scrotum found 11 cases of scrotal leiomyoma. Scrotal leiomyomas can affect males of any age and race, but are more common in Caucasians from the ages of 40–60. The tumor in the scrotum has an average diameter of 6.4 cm.

== Signs and symptoms ==
People with leiomyoma can be presented as asymptomatic, or having no symptoms. However, some people may experience severe symptoms that can interfere with daily activities. Common symptoms are recurrent pain and pressure in the affected region. People with uterine leiomyoma can experience pain during urination, bowel movements, and sexual intercourse. Other symptoms are abnormal vaginal bleeding and severe menstrual cramps.

Nipple-areolar leiomyomas can affect one or both nipples, presenting with symptoms of nipple tenderness. People with leiomyomas in the scrotum generally notice a growing testicle over a span of multiple years, where it can grow and become heavy to the point of discomfort. Due to the painless and slow, progressive growth of the tumor, the time frame between recognizing the tumor and surgical removal can be anywhere from 2 to 20 years.

== Causes ==
=== Uterine ===
==== Genetics ====
Development and progression of uterine leiomyomas may be contributed by changes in gene regulation or mutation of genes found to be associated with uterine fibroids. Abnormalities of these genes may initiate the formation or growth of these tumors. Modification of signaling pathways and genes (e.g. CYP1A1, CYP1b1, and MED12) exhibits a correlation with the development and growth of tumors in the uterus.

==== Hormones ====
The occurrence of uterine leiomyomas is mostly common during reproductive years. This suggests that the role of ovarian hormones, estrogen and progesterone, is important in the development of this disease. Studies have shown that the development of tumors rely on these hormones and that tumors have shown to affect estrogen metabolism as it can increase the amount both its estrogen and progesterone receptors.

==== Diet and nutrition ====
Long-term results suggests that diets that are mostly plant-based, composed of fruits and vegetables, and rich in Vitamin D have a positive effect on the development of diseases, including uterine leiomyomas. However, alcohol, coffee, and red meat may have an effect on the progression or growth of these diseases based on observational and epidemiological studies.

== Risk factors ==
=== Uterine ===
==== Race ====
At the age of 35, incidence is reported to be 60% in African-American with-uterus persons and 40% in Caucasian with-uterus persons. By the age of 50, the incidence of uterine fibroids was >80% in African-American with-uterus persons and >70% of Caucasian with-uterus persons.

Recurrence of uterine leiomyomas 4–5 years after removal occurs up to 59% of the time for with-uterus persons of African origin.

==== Age ====
People with uteri who delay their first pregnancy past the age of 30 are at a higher risk for uterine fibroids.

==== Genetic factors ====
Specific genetic alterations may play a role in the development of uterine leiomyomas. A mutation of a single mesenchymal cell, a stem cell that plays an important role in making and repairing bone, and fat – found in the bone marrow and adipose tissues, with the involvement of progesterone and 17 b-estrodiol – can lead to these fibroids.

==== Early menarche ====
Some early studies report early age onset of menstruation increases the risk of developing fibroids. However, the biological mechanism of how this occurs is not well understood and further investigation is needed.

=== Nipple-areolar ===
==== Age ====
The occurrence of benign tumors of the nipple commonly starts at the age of 20 and peaks around the age of 40 to 50. Growth of nipple-areolar leiomyomas may increase even after menopause.

== Diagnosis ==
There are many ways genital leiomyomas can be diagnosed. Those who have genital leiomyomas can be asymptomatic or symptomatic. Symptoms including but not limited to pelvic pain or abnormal menstrual bleeding are used to assess fibroids. Imaging are often used to detect the presence of fibroids, particularly uterine fibroids. This includes ultrasonography, a procedure that uses high-frequency sound waves to capture tissue and organ images; sonohysterography, a painless procedure similar to ultrasonography to capture images inside the uterus; and hysteroscopy, which examines the inside of the uterus and cervix using a flexible tube called a hysteroscope.

== Treatment ==
Treatment for genital leiomyomas primarily consists of surgical removal. However, genital leiomyomas typically re-occur and may reappear from 6 weeks to over 15 years post-removal. When managing leiomyomas, radiation treatment should be avoided due to the inducing effect of malignant transformation in the smooth muscle of the tumor.

For uterine leiomyomas, complete removal of the uterus is required. There is minimal evidence to support the use of myomectomy to preserve fertility. Evidence shows that preoperative use of gonadotropin-releasing hormone agonists, which prevents or lessen the production of hormones like progesterone, estrogen, and testosterone, can reduce surgical complications.

Subareolar leiomyomas require surgical removals. Precise surgical margins are needed to prevent re-occurrences.

Leiomyomas in the scrotum require an orchidectomy, or surgical removal of one or two testicles.

To manage pain that arises from the fibroids, drugs that affect smooth muscle contraction such as nitroglycerin, nifedipine, phenoxybenzamine and doxazosin can be employed to ease the pain. For nerve pain or tenderness, gabapentin and topical analgesics may be employed.

== Clinical cases ==
=== Nipple-areolar leiomyomas ===
==== 41-year-old male ====
A 41-year-old male presented with a yellow nodule in the upper left areola. He reported mild pain and itching, but denied other symptoms. Sebaceous glands, epidermal hyperplasia, and tumor nests were among the numerous findings that preceded a diagnosis of diagnosis of areolar leiomyoma with sebaceous hyperplasia. Characteristics of the leiomyoma included positive for estrogen and progesterone receptors and high expression of epidermal growth factor, insulin-like growth factor 1, and fibroblast growth factor-2. It is suspected that these growth factors led to the growth of the leiomyoma through an autocrine process. The patient declined resection and the region has remained stable since.

==== 67-year-old female ====
A 67-year-old female presented with a growing mass on the left breast areolar region. The patient had been taking methotrexate to treat her rheumatoid arthritis. Magnetic resonance imaging led to a conclusion that the tumor arose from the areola. A biopsy led to a diagnosis of diffuse large, non-GC B-cell lymphoma that was suspected to be associated with methotrexate. The tumor reduced in size following the withdrawal of methotrexate. Three months later, another tumor developed in the areolar region of the opposite breast.

==== 35-year-old female ====
A 35-year-old female presented with a painful lump in the right nipple. The patient reported the lump occurred after a breastfeeding injury three years prior to coming into the outpatient center. The tumor has been growing ever since. A biopsy was performed to confirm the leiomyoma in the nipple.

=== Uterine leiomyomas ===
==== 48-year-old female ====
A 48-year-old-female presented with several uterine fibroids that were asymptomatic. The tumor was removed vaginally and was revealed to be a vaginal leiomyoma. Vaginal leiomyomas are rare and removal by vaginal route is the preferred treatment option.

=== Scrotal leiomyomas ===
==== 39-year-old male ====
A 39-year-old male presented with a dull aching pain in the right scrotum. The patient had a history of his right scrotum slowly growing for the past year. There were no other symptoms of urinary tract infections (UTIs), cough, fever, weight loss, or night sweats. Further examination and an ultrasound scan found a firm mass in the right scrotum with a size of 6 cm x 4 cm that was inseparable from the testis. The patient underwent a right radical orchiectomy, or a surgical operation to remove the one or more testicles, since malignancy of the tumor could not be determined. The patient recovered and was discharged home after the operation.

==== 71-year-old male ====
A 71-year-old male presented with a large and heavy left scrotum that has been growing for 10 years. Further examination confirmed a firm tumor in the left scrotum that was attached to the testis. The tumor was measured to be 11 cm in diameter. The patient underwent orchidectomy, or surgical removal of the testicle.

== See also ==
- List of cutaneous conditions
