= Pleomorphism (cytology) =

Variability in the size and shape of a cell or nucleus

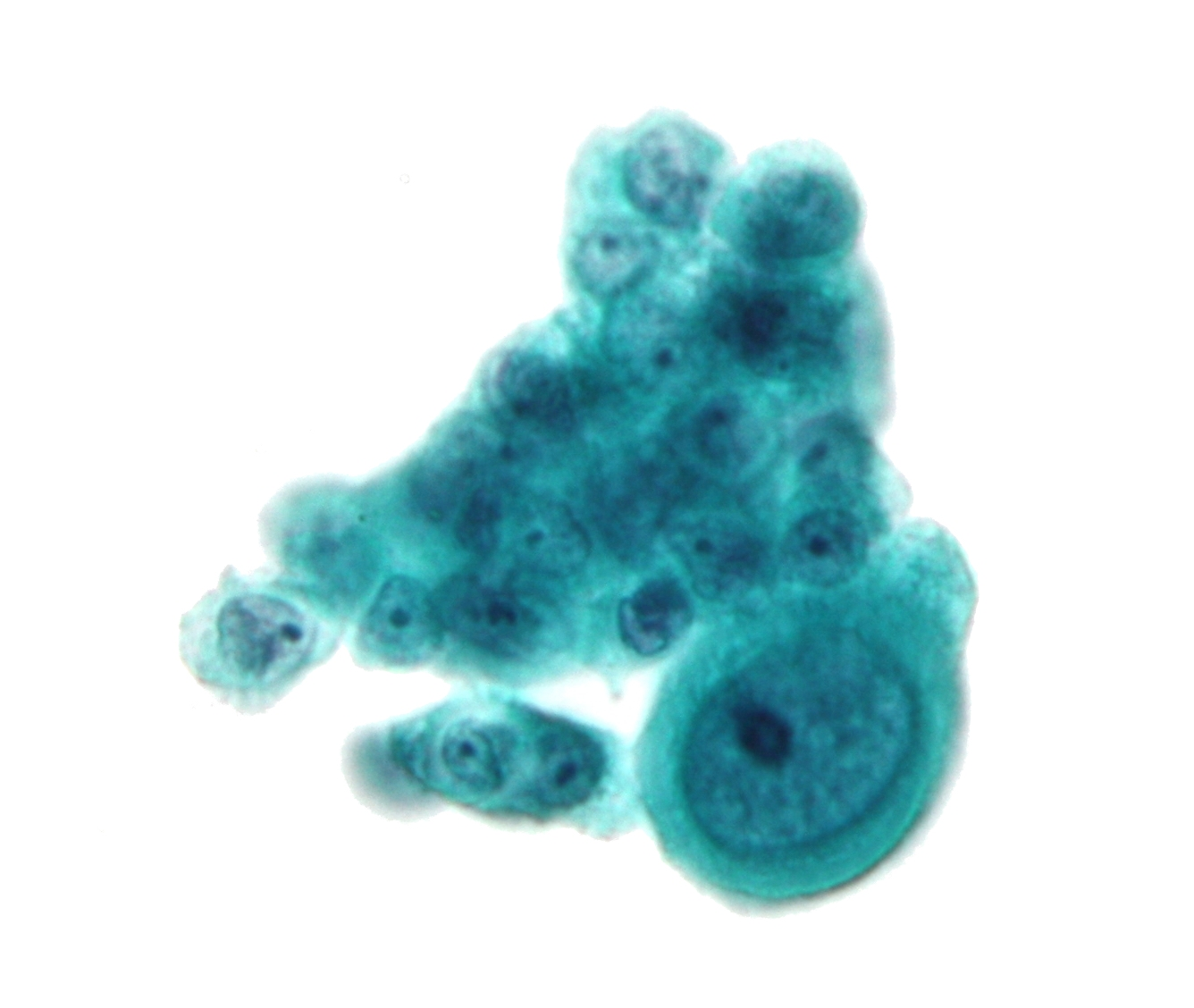
A micrograph showing cells with marked nuclear shape and size variation, a component of nuclear pleomorphism.

Pleomorphism is a term used in histology and cytopathology to describe variability in the size, shape and staining of cells and/or their nuclei. Several key determinants of cell and nuclear size, like ploidy and the regulation of cellular metabolism, are commonly disrupted in tumors. Therefore, cellular and nuclear pleomorphism is one of the earliest hallmarks of cancer progression and a feature characteristic of malignant neoplasms and dysplasia. Certain benign cell types may also exhibit pleomorphism, e.g. neuroendocrine cells, Arias-Stella reaction.

A rare type of rhabdomyosarcoma that is found in adults is known as pleomorphic rhabdomyosarcoma.

Despite the prevalence of pleomorphism in human pathology, its role in disease progression is unclear. In epithelial tissue, pleomorphism in cellular size can induce packing defects and disperse aberrant cells. But the consequence of atypical cell and nuclear morphology in other tissues is unknown.

== See also ==
- Anaplasia
- Cell growth
- Cytopathology
- Giant cell carcinoma of the lung
- Nuclear atypia
