= Angioleiomyoma =

- Other names: Angiomyoma, vascular leiomyoma
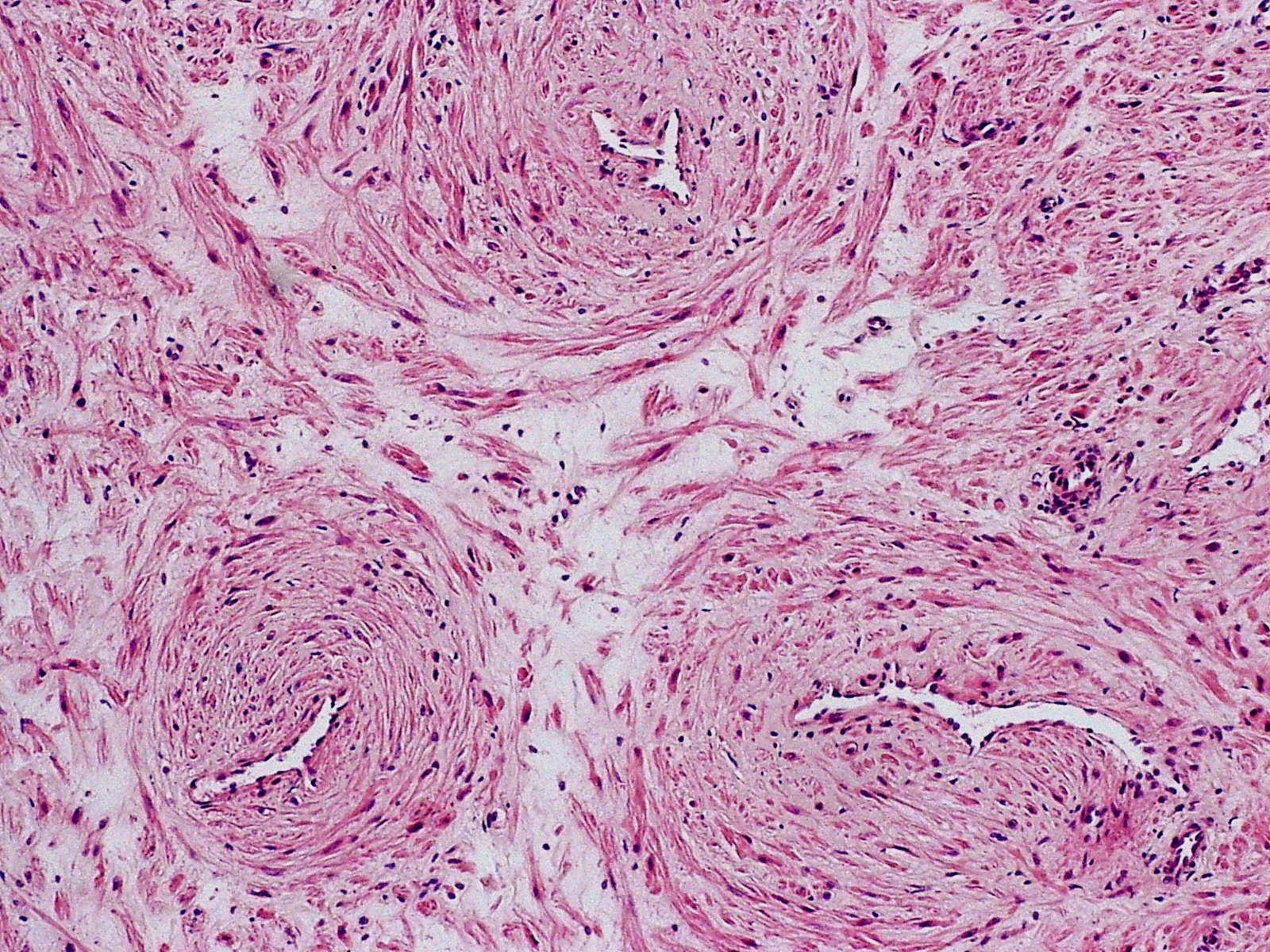
- Angioleiomyoma, smooth muscles encircling dilatated blood vessels
- Specialty: Oncology, rheumatology
- Symptoms: Pain (with or without tenderness), slow-growing benign mass in the subcutaneous region of the extremities.
- Usual onset: Can occur at any age, with a peak in middle age.
- Causes: Unknown.
- Differential diagnosis: Many, including ganglion cyst, traumatic neuroma, schwannoma, eccrine spiradenoma, angiolipoma, fibroma and synovial sarcoma.
- Treatment: Surgical excision.
- Frequency: Rare, more common in women.

Angioleiomyoma (vascular leiomyoma, angiomyoma) of the skin is thought to arise from vascular smooth muscle, and is generally acquired. Angioleiomyomas appear as small (<2 cm), firm, movable, slow growing subcutaneous nodules. Pain is a common symptom. They are most commonly seen on the extremities. The cause of angioleiomyoma is unknown.

== Signs and symptoms ==
Angioleiomyomas present as solitary, small, slow-growing, firm, movable, subcutaneous nodules that typically measure less than 2 cm in size. Pain is the most obvious symptom of angioleiomyomas. Wind and cold exposure can set off paroxysmal episodes of pain. It is believed to be caused by smooth muscle contractions that are active and cause localized ischemia. It seems that rest is a relieving aspect. Although this tumor can develop anywhere in the body, it usually first appears in the extremities, then the head and trunk. The lesion is usually located in the subcutis, however it can also appear in the dermis.

== Causes ==
The exact etiology of angioleiomyomas is yet unknown. Aetiological aspects that have been suggested include minor trauma, venous stasis, and hormonal alterations, particularly those related to estrogen. The venous stasis idea is supported by the observation of chronic inflammatory cell infiltrates in certain lesions. Angioleiomyomas have been linked to Epstein-Barr virus (EBV) infection in immunocompromised patients.

== Diagnosis ==
Histologically, angioleiomyomas have a unique pattern with several tiny vascular gaps surrounded by bundles of spindle-shaped smooth muscle cells.

Angioleiomyoma appears to be benign on ultrasonography, with well-defined boundaries and a homogenous shape. High resistance in intratumour arteries is revealed by a color Doppler examination, indicating the existence of muscle arteries.

== Treatment ==
Angioleiomyoma are treated by surgical excisision.

== Epidemiology ==
Angioleiomyomas make around 5% of all benign soft tissue neoplasms. They primarily afflict people in their third and fifth decades of life, and they are more common in women than in men.

== See also ==
- Leiomyoma
- Skin lesions
