= CYLD =

CYLD may refer to:

- Chapleau Airport, an airport in Ontario, Canada, ICAO code CYLD
- CYLD (gene), an evolutionary ancient gene
