= Dermal cylindroma =

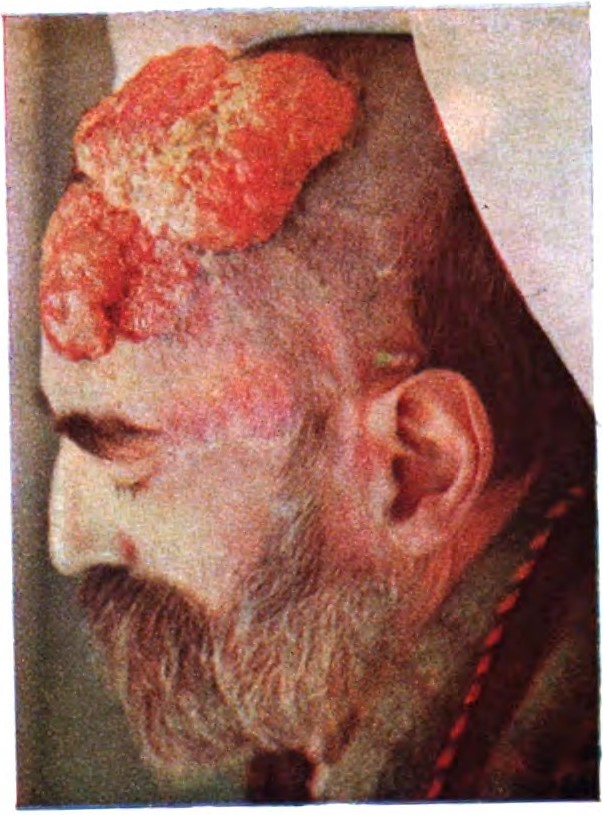
- Dermal cylindroma treated with X-rays without recurrence

In dermatologic pathology, a dermal cylindroma, also dermal eccrine cylindroma or cutaneous cylindroma) and (less specifically) cylindroma, is a benign adnexal tumor that occurs on the scalp and forehead.

Multiple cylindromas may grow together in a "hat-like" configuration, sometimes referred to as a turban tumor. Cylindromas are uncommon dysplasias of skin appendages.

== Histology ==
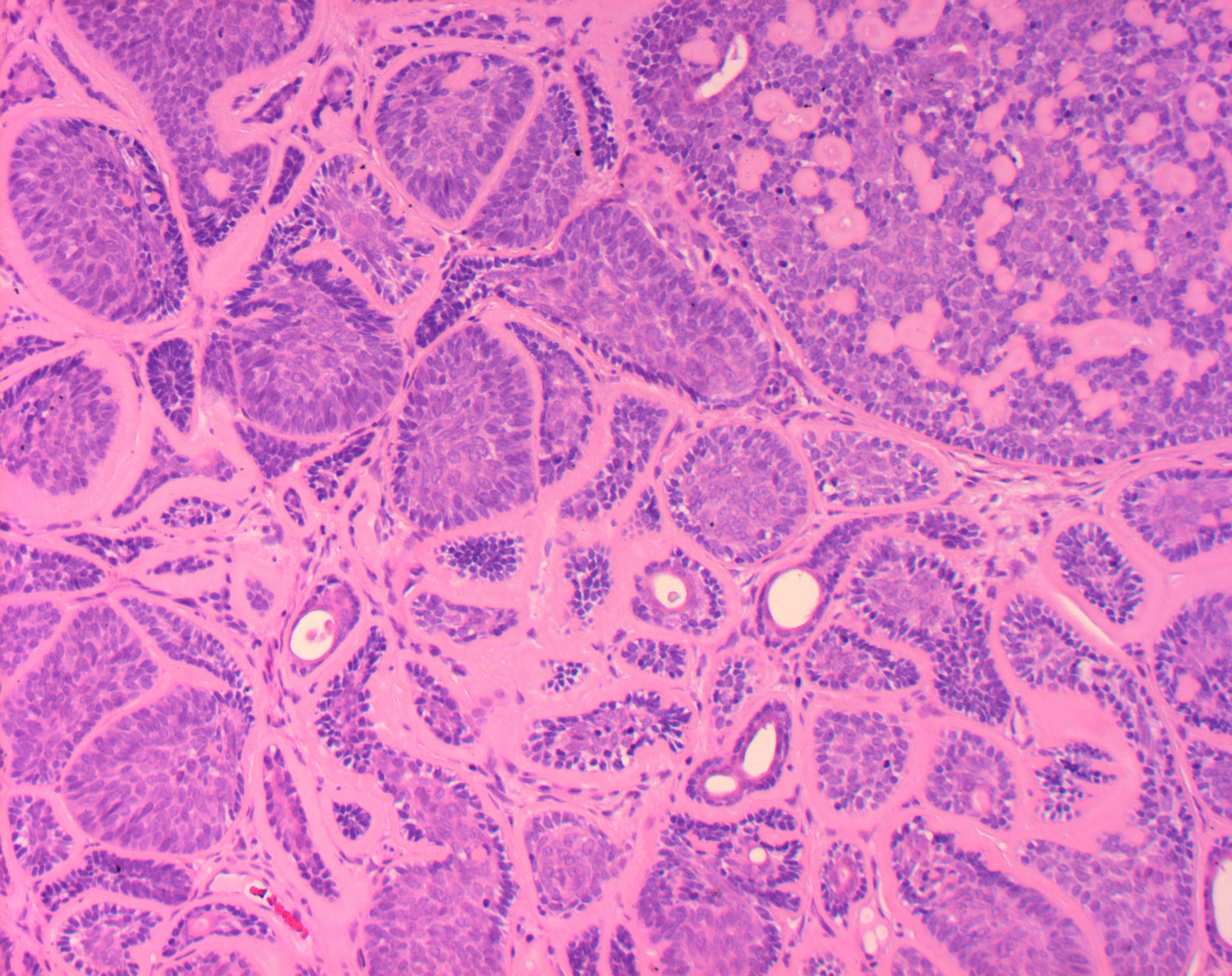
Micrograph of a cylindroma. H/E stain

Dermal cylindromas are:

- Dermal lesions consisting of nests of cells that are surrounded by hyaline (i.e., glassy, eosinophilic, acellular) material and have:
  - Hyperchromatic nuclei that may palisade (columnar nuclei arranged around the periphery of the cell nests with their short axis tangential to the nest periphery), and
  - Cells with lighter staining ovoid nuclei at their centre.

They lack of a significant number of lymphocytes; this differentiates them from spiradenomas.

== Additional images ==
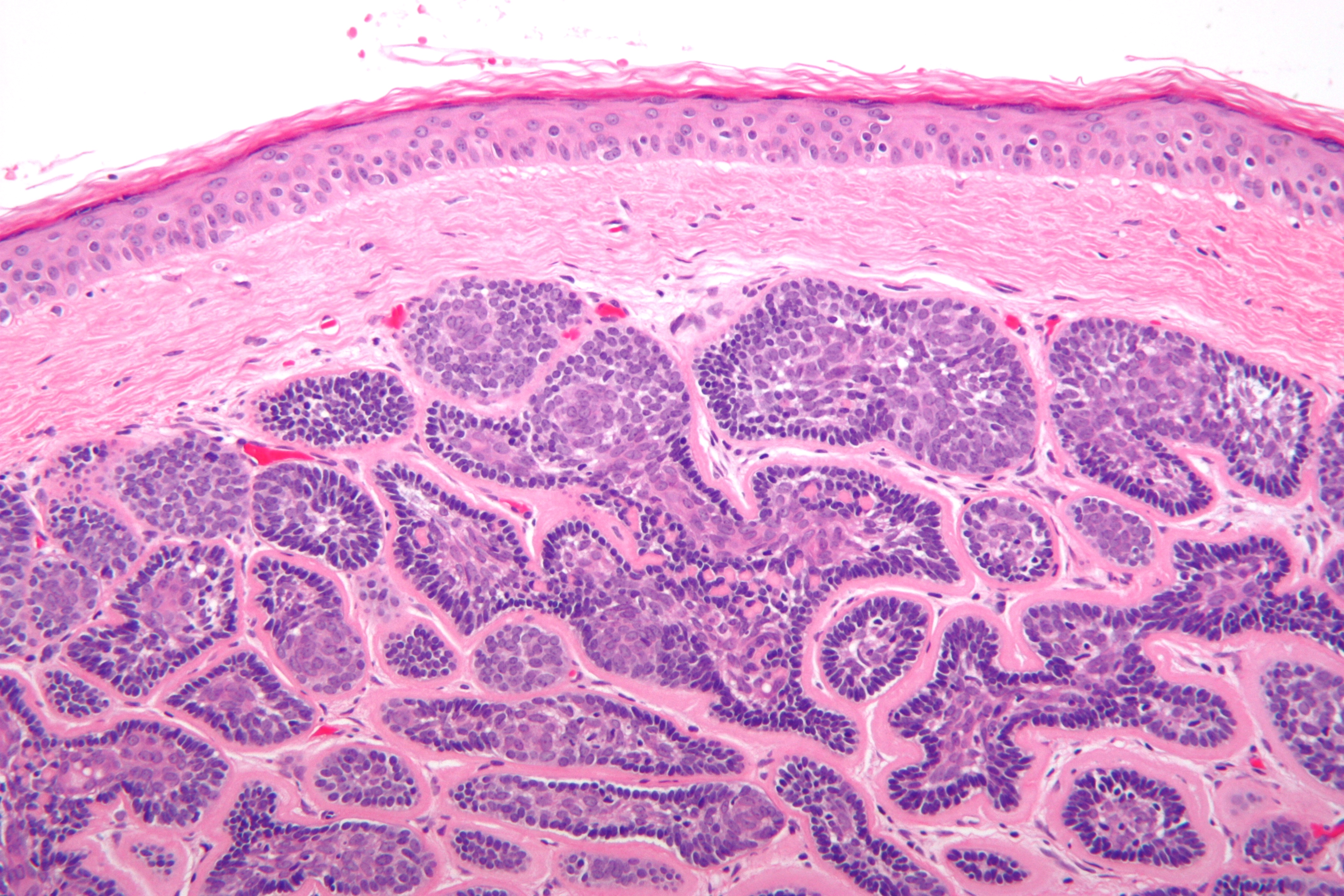
Micrograph of a dermal cylindroma in H&E stain.

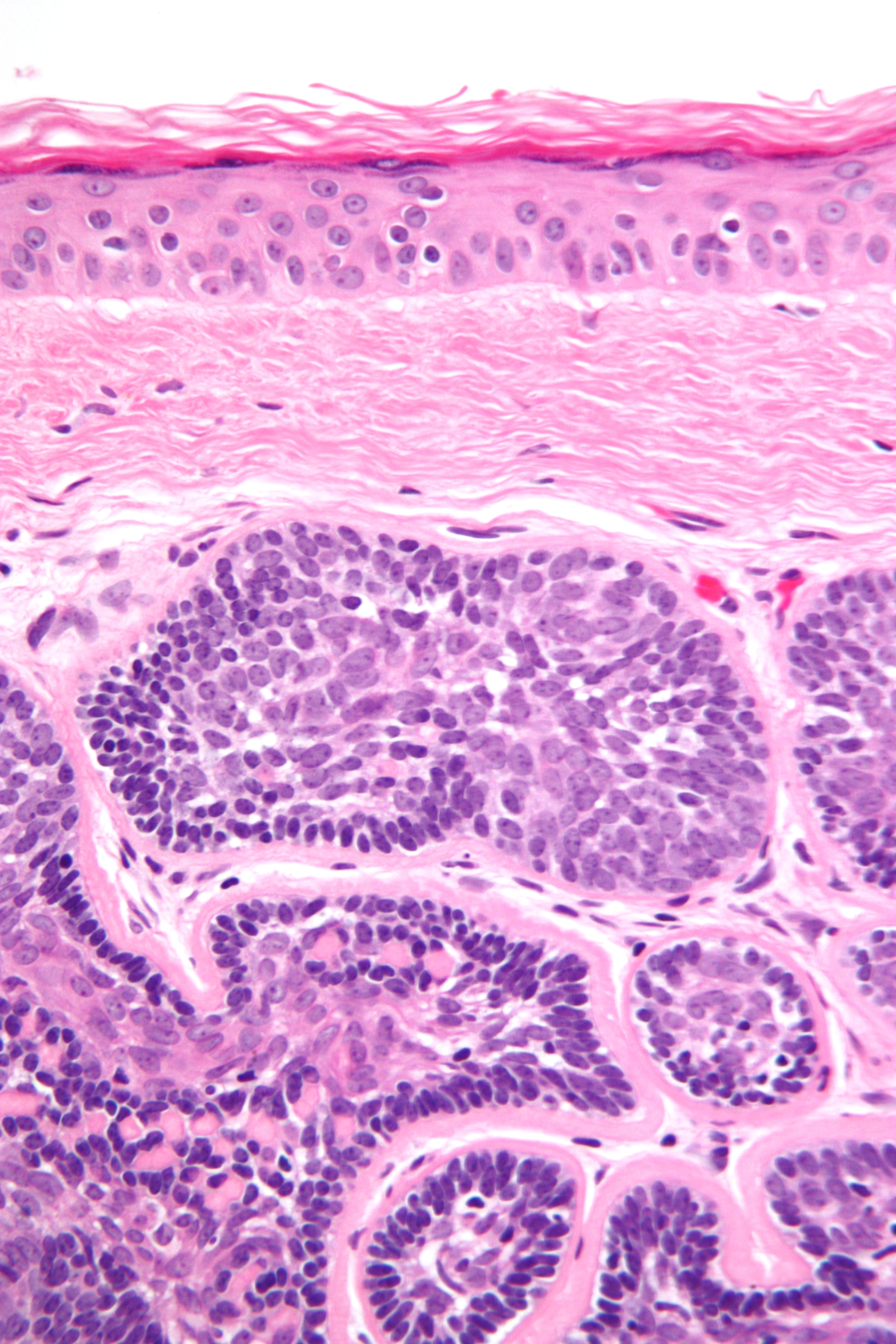
Micrograph of dermal cylindroma in H&E stain.

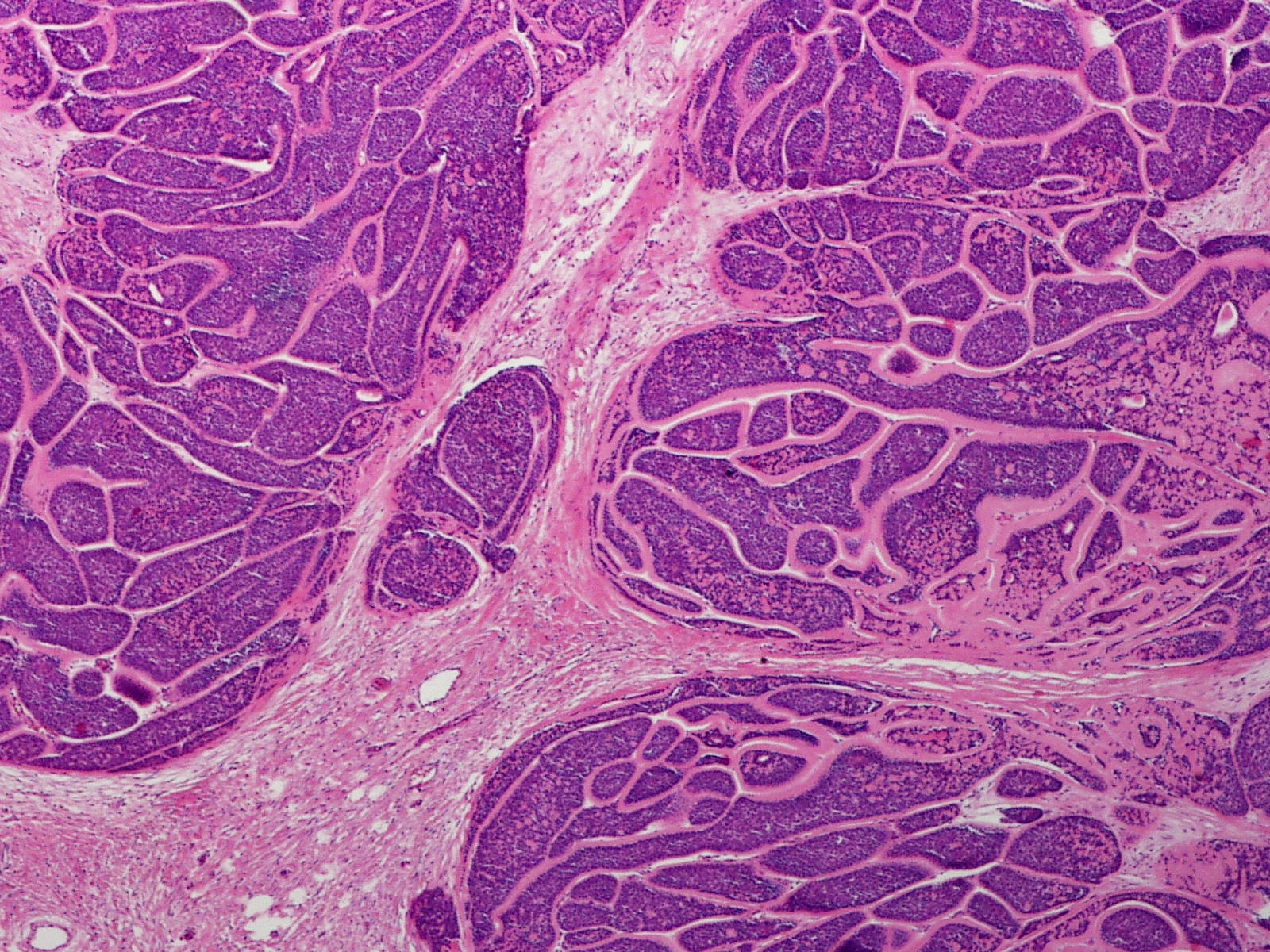
Dermal cylindroma. Puzzle-like distribution of tumour foci.

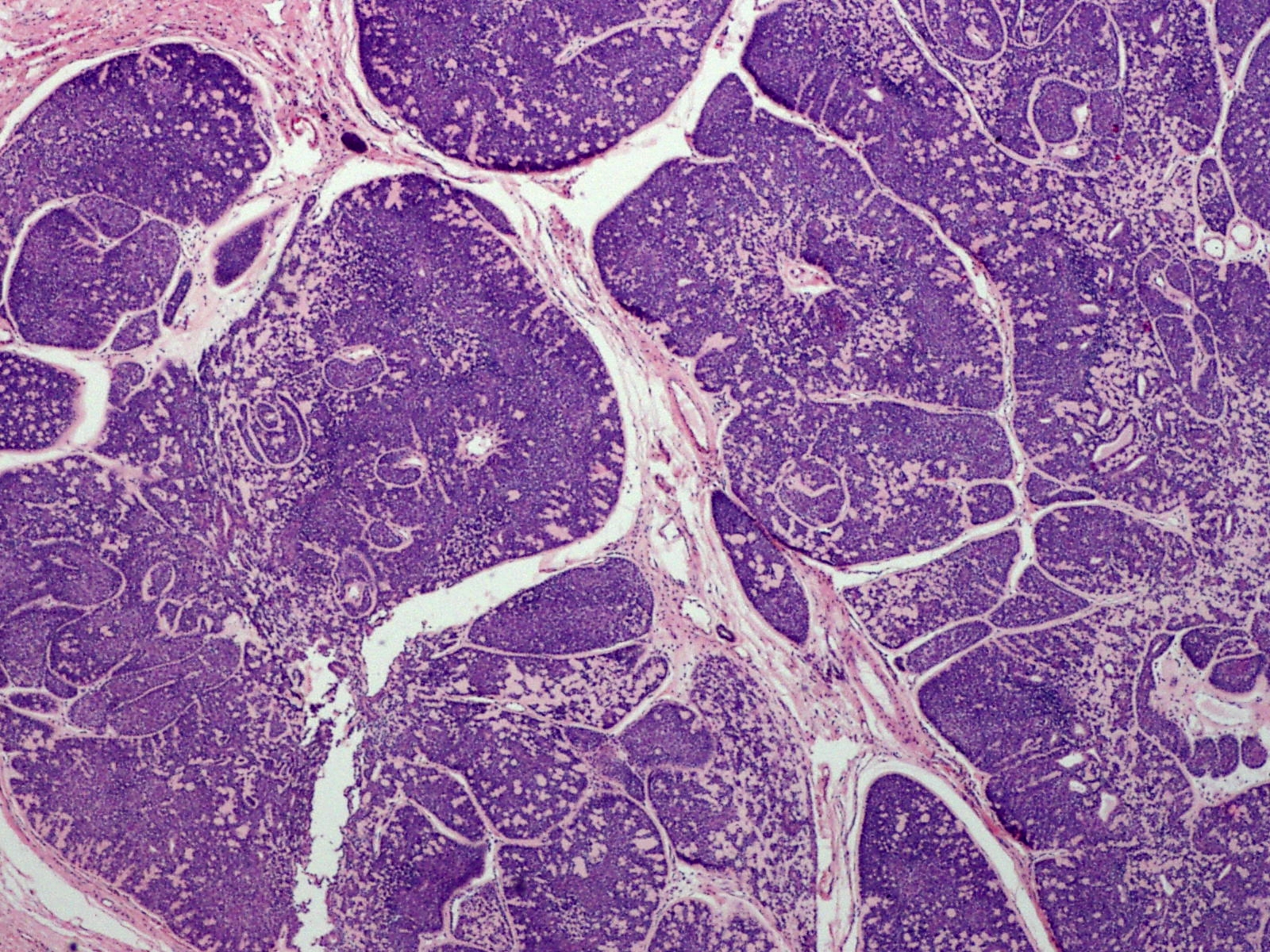
Dermal cylindroma. Hyaline droplets visible in lobules.

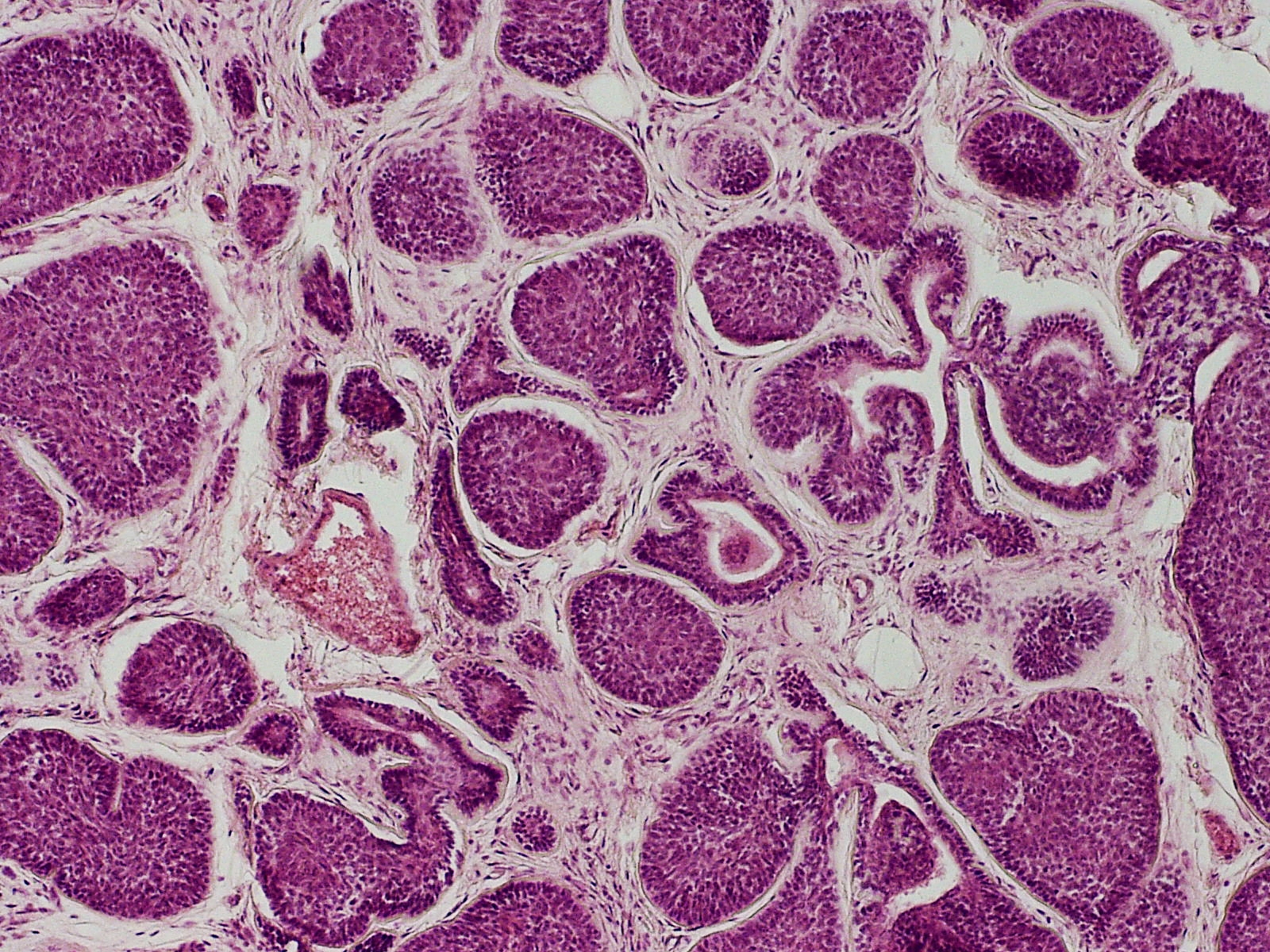
Dermal cylindroma, micronodular type.

== See also ==
- Spiradenoma
- Malignant acrospiroma
