= Glycogenic acanthosis =

- Endoscopic image of glycogenic acanthosis found incidentally
- Specialty: Gastroenterology

Glycogenic acanthosis are small raised white plaques commonly seen in the esophageal mucosa. It is seen incidentally in 3.5% of gastroscopies.

== Signs and symptoms ==
On gastroscopy, glycogenic acanthosis is seen as a multitude of small white raised plaques of 2 mm to 10 mm in size, which may be seen throughout the esophagus. They tend to occur on esophageal folds, and may be missed if the esophagus is not well distended with air. It may be seen on esophageal x-rays; it is not seen on standard esophograms, but can be seen with double-contrast studies. Biopsies of the lesions show hypertrophied stratified squamous mucosa with glycogen deposition in the mucosa.

Clinically, mild glycogenic acanthosis is a normal finding, and does not progress to esophageal cancer or to stricture. It is not related to leukoplakia, and is not dysplastic or premalignant. It was originally thought to be associated with gastroesophageal reflux disease (GERD), but the association is not entirely clear. One report also shows an association with celiac disease, but again, this has not shown been beyond that. Extensive glycogenic acanthosis has been shown to be associated with Cowden's syndrome.

== Diagnosis ==
Glycogenic acanthosis is characterized by epithelial hyperplasia, with an increased number of enlarged epithelial cells containing abundant glycogen. There is no associated hyperkeratosis, inflammation, dysplasia, or cellular atypia.
