= Trichilemmoma =

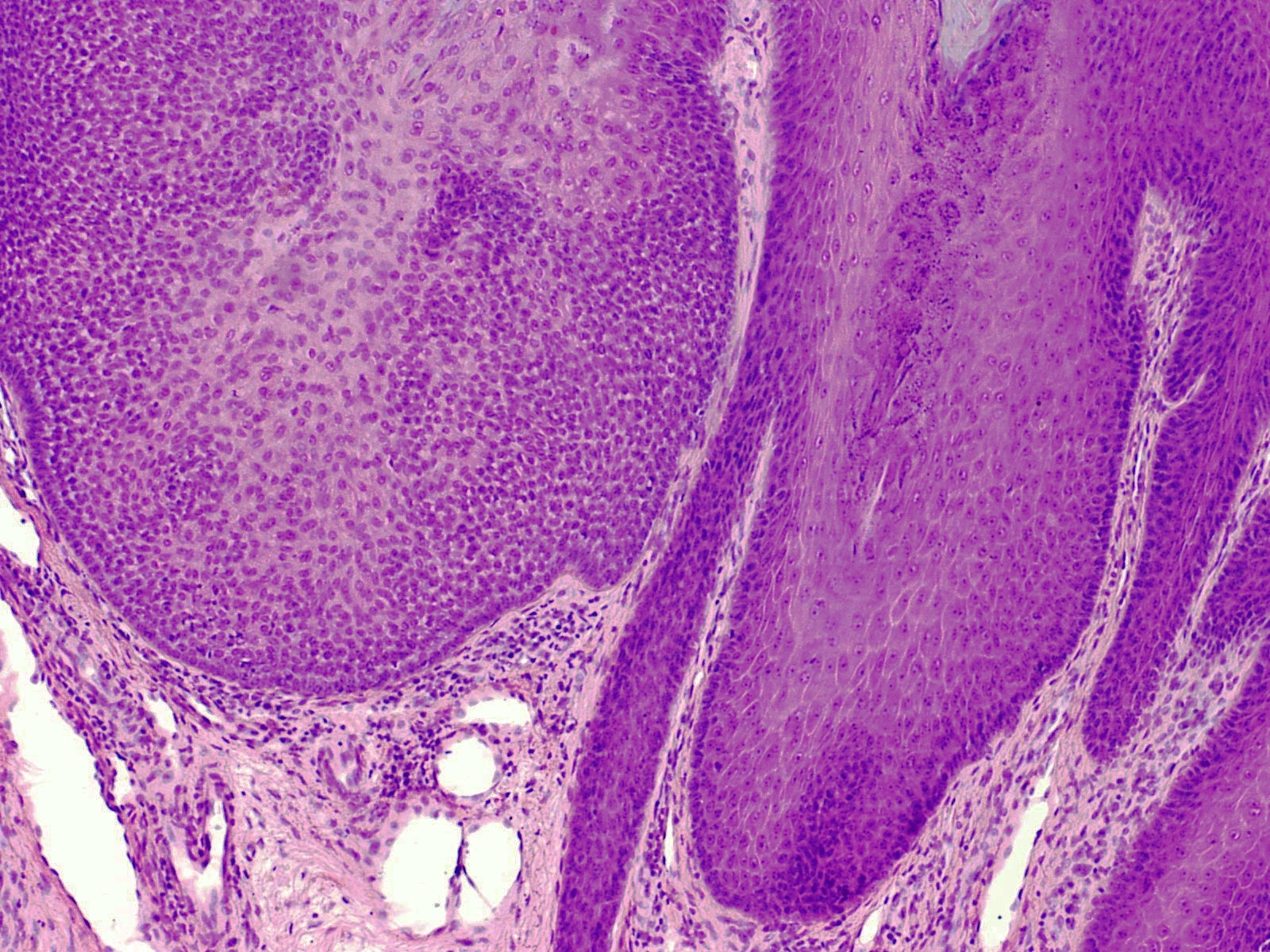
- Specialty: Oncology, dermatology

Trichilemmoma (also known as "tricholemmoma") is a benign cutaneous neoplasm that shows differentiation toward cells of the outer root sheath. The lesion is often seen in the face and neck region. Multifocal occurrence is associated with Cowden syndrome, in which hamartomatous intestinal polyposis is seen in conjunction with multiple tricholemmoma lesions.

== Additional images ==
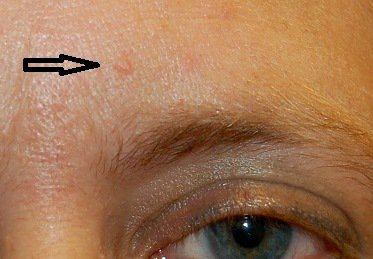
A trichilemmoma on a forehead

== See also ==
- Cowden syndrome
- Trichilemmal carcinoma
- List of cutaneous conditions
- List of cutaneous neoplasms associated with systemic syndromes
