= Trichofolliculoma =

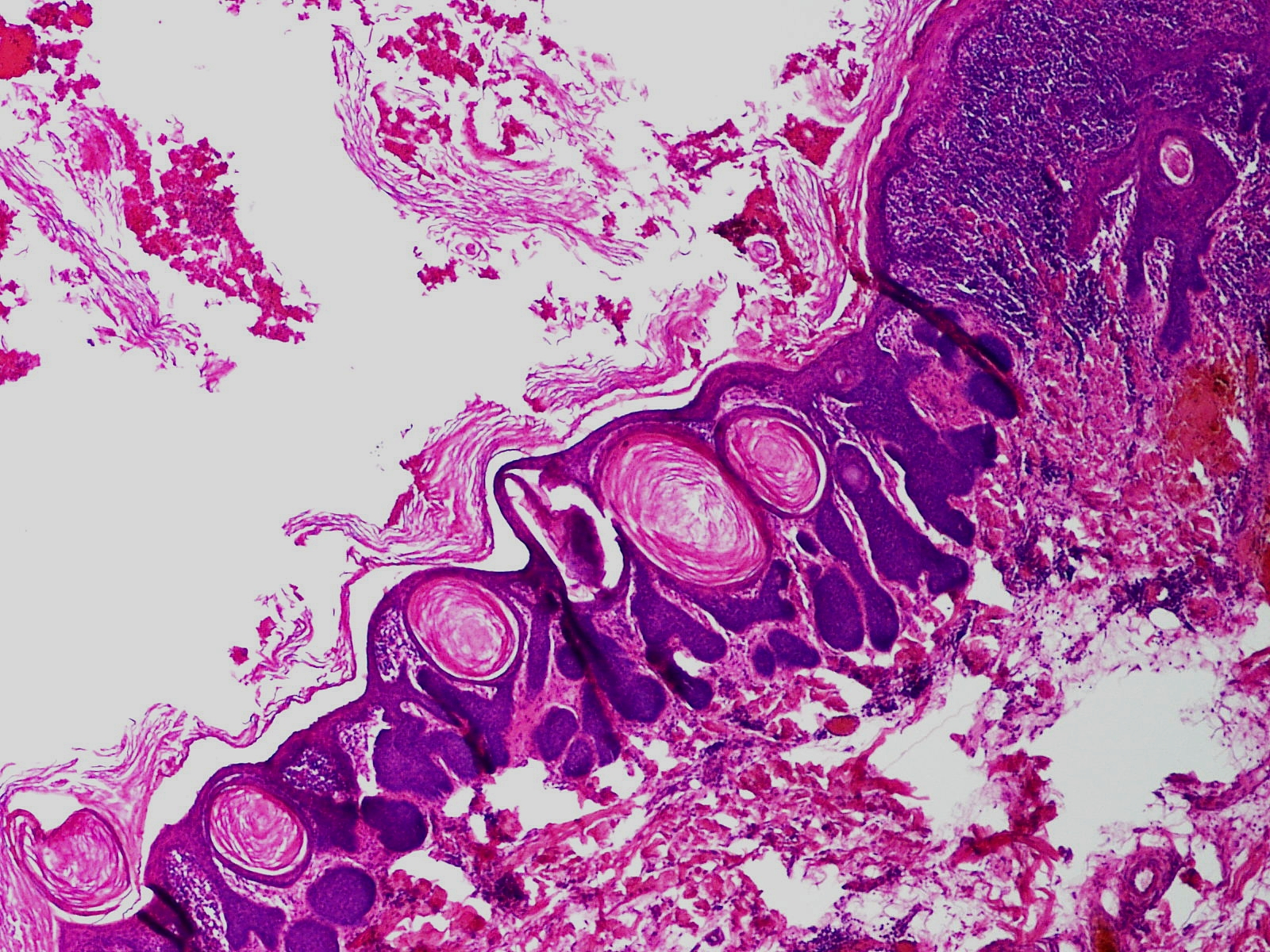
- Specialty: Dermatology, oncology

Trichofolliculoma is a cutaneous condition characterized by a benign, highly structured tumor of the pilosebaceous unit. Trichofolliculoma is a rare tumor of the eyelid. It can be suspected by the “cotton bag sign”

== See also ==
- Multiple familial trichoepithelioma
- Pilomatricoma
- Skin lesion
- List of cutaneous conditions
