= Cylindroma =

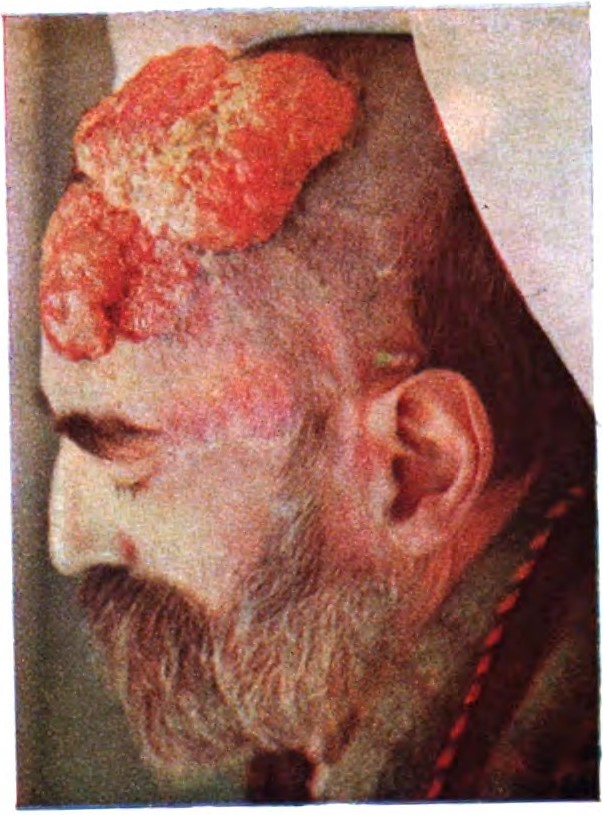
- TURBAN TUMOUR (CYLINDROMA). A rapidly growing fungating tumour on the scalp.
- Specialty: Oncology, dermatology

Cylindroma is a rare, slow-growing, benign adnexal tumor of the skin. It mostly affects the face, scalp, and neck regions.

Types include:

- Dermal eccrine cylindroma, a benign tumor of the skin
- Adenoid cystic carcinoma, a malignant tumor of the salivary gland

== Signs and symptoms ==
Grossly, the tumors are smooth, firm, pink to crimson in hue, commonly pedunculated, and often numerous. Tumors can sometimes cause pain. The scalp and surrounding skin are the most common sites, and the masses can coalesce to form a "turban tumor," in a hat-like arrangement. When pedunculated, the tumors may be nearly hairless, although the smaller lesions produce dermal nodules with minimal hair loss over them.

Microscopically, cylindromas can be seen with islands of basaloid cells that fit together as if in a jigsaw puzzle.

Photomicrograph of a dermal eccrine cylindroma under H&E stain. Note the islands of basaloid cells that fit together.

== Pathogenesis ==
Cylindromas can be sporadic or inherited. Inherited or familial cylindromas are associated with inactivating mutations in the CYLD tumor suppressor gene, while sporadic cylindromas are associated with MYB-NFIB fusion transcripts.

However, despite being named after the tumor, mutation in the CYLD gene does not exclusively result in cylindromas or cylindromatosis. Other diseases, like trichoepitheliomas and Brooke-Spiegler syndrome, are also associated with the CYLD gene.

== Diagnosis ==
Computed tomography or magnetic resonance imaging provide the best representation of the tumour's extension.

== Treatment ==
As cylindromas are benign, they can be fully treated by surgical excision.

== See also ==
- CYLD cutaneous syndrome
- List of cutaneous neoplasms associated with systemic syndromes
