= Keratocyst =

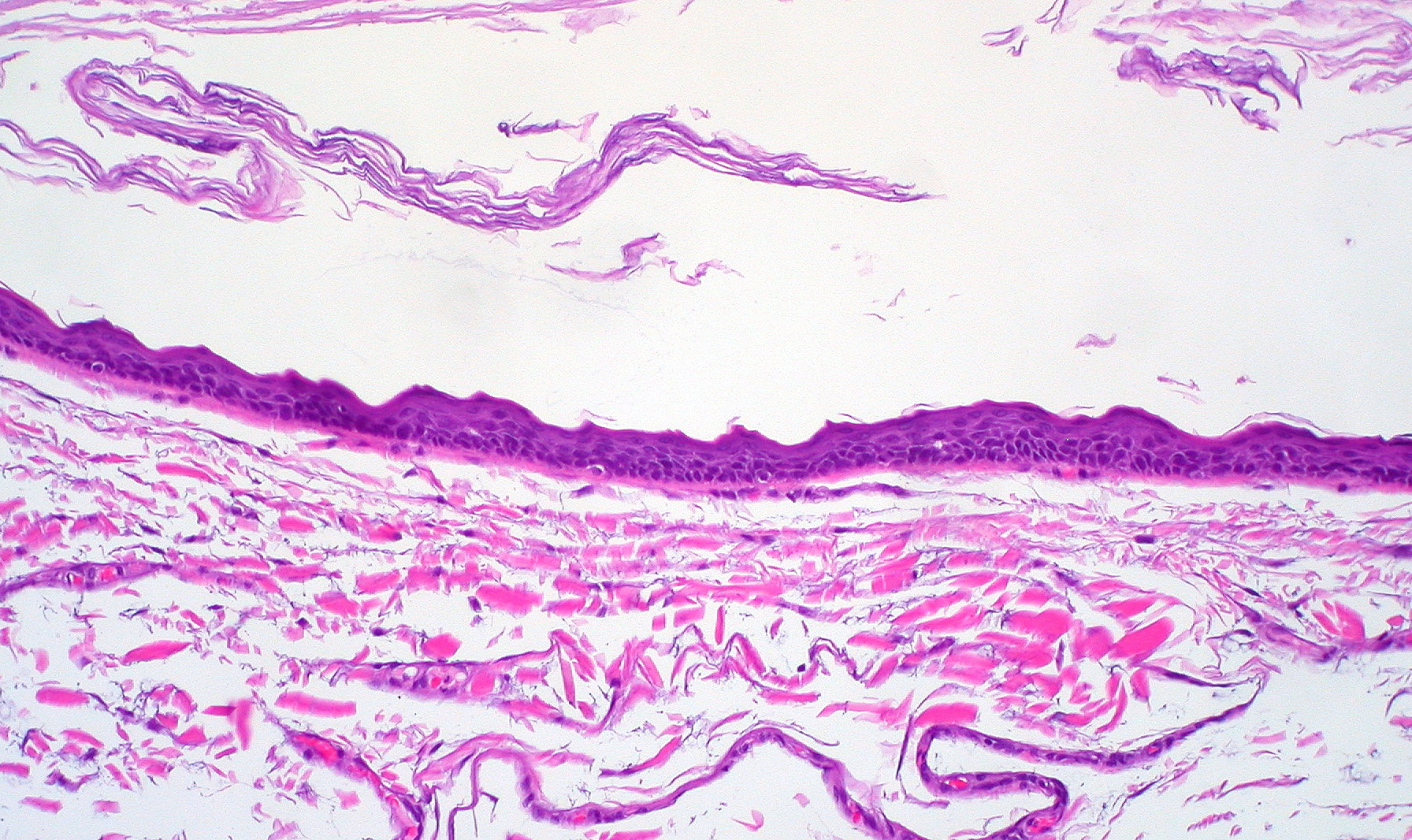
- Cutaneous Keratocyst
- Specialty: Dermatology

A keratocyst is a type of cutaneous cyst. They appear similar to epidermoid cysts; however, are not limited to a specified location on the body. Keratocyst are most often reported in persons with nevoid basal cell carcinoma syndrome.

== Pathology ==
Keratocysts have a stratified squamous epithelial wall without sebaceous lobules.

== See also ==
- List of cutaneous conditions
