= Cowden syndrome =

Familial syndrome causing hamartomas and cancers

- Other names: Cowden's disease, multiple hamartoma syndrome
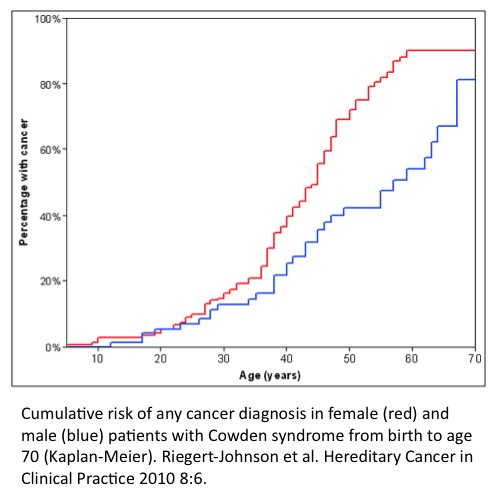
- Kaplan–Meier plot showing cumulative risk for the development of cancer in males (blue lower curve) and females (red upper curve) with Cowden syndrome from birth to age 70.
- Specialty: Oncology, Dermatology, Gastroenterology, Neurology
- Frequency: 1 in 200,000 individuals

Cowden syndrome (also known as Cowden's disease) is an autosomal dominant inherited condition characterized by benign overgrowths called hamartomas as well as an increased lifetime risk of breast, thyroid, uterine, and other cancers. It is also known as multiple hamartoma syndrome, a name shared by a more general syndrome of the same name. It is often underdiagnosed due to variability in disease presentation, but 99% of patients report mucocutaneous symptoms by age 20–29. Despite some considering it a primarily dermatologic condition, Cowden's syndrome is a multi-system disorder that also includes neurodevelopmental disorders such as macrocephaly.

The incidence of Cowden's disease is about 1 in 200,000, making it quite rare. Because the diagnosis of Cowden's syndrome is difficult to establish, this incidence is suspected to be an underestimation. Furthermore, early and continuous screening is essential in the management of this disorder to prevent malignancies. It is associated with mutations in PTEN on 10q23.3, a tumor suppressor gene otherwise known as phosphatase and tensin homolog, that results in dysregulation of the mTOR pathway leading to errors in cell proliferation, cell cycling, and apoptosis. The most common malignancies associated with the syndrome are adenocarcinoma of the breast (20%), followed by adenocarcinoma of the thyroid (7%), squamous cell carcinomas of the skin (4%), and the remaining from the colon, uterus, or others (1%).

== Signs and symptoms ==
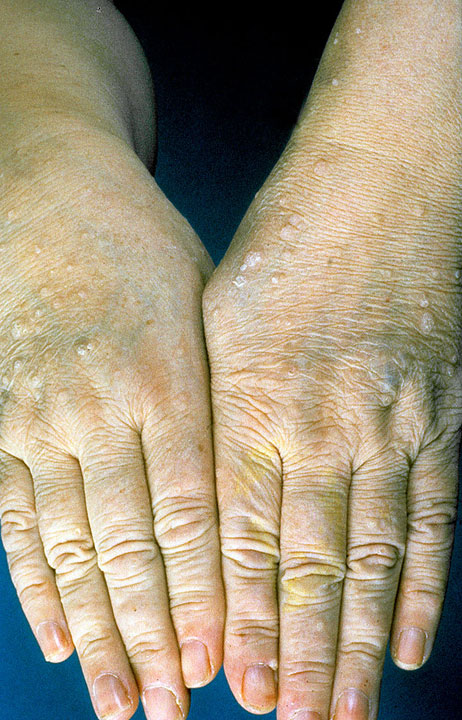
Cowden's disease displaying typical trichilemmomas (small, benign bumps) on the back of both hands

As Cowden's disease is a multi-system disorder, the physical manifestations are broken down by organ system:

=== Skin ===
Adolescent patients affected with Cowden syndrome develop characteristic lesions called trichilemmomas, which typically develop on the face, and verrucous papules around the mouth and on the ears. Oral papillomas are also common. Furthermore, shiny palmar keratoses with central dells are also present. At birth or in childhood, classic features of Cowden's include pigmented genital lesions, lipomas, epidermal nevi, and cafe-au-lait spots. Squamous cell carcinomas of the skin may also occur. Patients are also at an increased risk for Cutaneous melanoma with the lifetime risk estimated at 6%.

=== Thyroid ===
Two thirds of patients have thyroid disorders, and these typically include benign follicular adenomas or multinodular goiter of the thyroid. Additionally, Cowden's patients are more susceptible to developing thyroid cancer than the general population. It is estimated that less than 10 percent of individuals with Cowden syndrome may develop follicular thyroid cancer. Cases of papillary thyroid cancer have been reported as well.

=== Female and male genitourinary ===
Females have an elevated risk of developing endometrial cancers, which is highest for those under the age of 50. Currently, it is not clear whether uterine leiomyomata (fibroids) or congenital genitourinary abnormalities occur at an increased rate in Cowden syndrome patients as compared to the general population. The occurrence of multiple testicular lipomas, or testicular lipomatosis, is a characteristic finding in male patients with Cowden syndrome.

=== Gastrointestinal ===
Polyps are extremely common as they are found in about 95% of Cowden syndrome patients undergoing a colonoscopy. They are numerous ranging from a few to hundreds, usually of the hamartomatous subtype, and distributed across the colon as well as other areas within the gastrointestinal tract. Other types of polyps that may be encountered less frequently include ganglioneuromatous, adenomatous, and lymphoid polyps. Diffuse glycogenic acanthosis of the esophagus is another gastrointestinal manifestation associated with Cowden syndrome.

Patients are also at an increased risk for colorectal cancer with an estimated lifetime risk at 9%.

=== Breast ===
Females are at an increased risk of developing breast cancer, which is the most common malignancy observed in Cowden's patients. The lifetime risk for female breast cancer in Cowden's patients is estimated at 85% and an average age of diagnosis between 38 and 46 years. Although some cases have been reported, there is not enough evidence to indicate an association between Cowden syndrome and the development of male breast cancer. Up to 75% demonstrate benign breast conditions such as intraductal papillomatosis, fibroadenomas, and fibrocystic changes. However, there is currently not enough evidence to determine if benign breast disease occurs more frequently in Cowden's patients as compared to individuals without a hereditary cancer syndrome.

=== Central nervous system ===
Macrocephaly is observed in 84% of patients with Cowden syndrome. It typically occurs due to an abnormally enlarged brain, or megalencephaly. Patients may also exhibit dolichocephaly. Varying degrees of autism spectrum disorder and intellectual disability have been reported as well. Lhermitte-Duclos disease is a benign cerebellar tumor that typically does not manifest until adulthood in patients with Cowden syndrome.

== Genetics ==
Cowden syndrome is inherited in an autosomal dominant fashion. Germline mutations in PTEN (phosphatase and tensin homolog), a tumor suppressor gene, are found in up to 80% of Cowden's patients. Several other hereditary cancer syndromes, such as Bannayan–Riley–Ruvalcaba syndrome, have been associated with mutations in the PTEN gene as well. PTEN negatively regulates the cytoplasmic receptor tyrosine kinase pathway, which is responsible for cell growth and survival, and also functions to repair errors in DNA. Thus, in the absence of this protein, cancerous cells are more likely to develop, survive, and proliferate.

Recently, it was discovered that germline heterozygous mutations in SEC23B, a component of coat protein complex II vesicles secreted from the endoplasmic reticulum, are associated with Cowden syndrome. A possible interplay between PTEN and SEC23B has recently been suggested, given emerging evidence of each having a role in ribosome biogenesis, but this has not been conclusively determined.

== Diagnosis ==
The revised clinical criteria for the diagnosis of Cowden's syndrome for an individual is dependent on either one of the following: 1) 3 major criteria are met or more that must include macrocephaly, Lhermitte-Duclos, or GI hamartomas 2) two major and three minor criteria. The major and minor criteria are listed below:

Cowden Syndrome Diagnostic Criteria (Suggested by Pilarski et al.)
Major criteria
Breast cancer
Endometrial cancer (epithelial)
Thyroid cancer (follicular)
Gastrointestinal hamartomas (including ganglioneuromas, but excluding hyperplastic polyps; ≥3)
Lhermitte-Duclos disease (adult)
Macrocephaly (≥97 percentile: 58 cm for females, 60 cm for males)
Macular pigmentation of the glans penis
Multiple mucocutaneous lesions (any of the following):
Multiple trichilemmomas (≥3, at least one biopsy proven)
Acral keratoses (≥3 palmoplantar keratotic pits and/or acral hyperkeratotic papules)
Mucocutaneous neuromas (≥3)
Oral papillomas (particularly on tongue and gingiva), multiple (≥3) OR biopsy proven OR dermatologist diagnosed
Minor criteria
Autism spectrum disorder
Colon cancer
Esophageal glycogenic acanthosis (≥3)
Lipomas (≥ 3)
intellectual disability (i.e., IQ ≤ 75)
Renal cell carcinoma
Testicular lipomatosis
Thyroid cancer (papillary or follicular variant of papillary)
Thyroid structural lesions (e.g., adenoma, multinodular goiter)
Vascular anomalies (including multiple intracranial developmental venous anomalies)

== Screening ==
The management of Cowden syndrome centers on the early detection and prevention of cancer types that are known to occur as part of this syndrome. Specific screening guidelines for Cowden syndrome patients have been published by the National Comprehensive Cancer Network (NCCN). Surveillance focuses on the early detection of breast, endometrial, thyroid, colorectal, renal, and skin cancer. See below for a complete list of recommendations from the NCCN:

Screening guidelines for patients with Cowden syndrome (adapted from the NCCN)
Women	Men and Women
Breast awareness starting at age 18 years of age	Annual comprehensive physical exam starting at 18 years of age or 5 years before the youngest age of diagnosis of a component cancer in the family (whichever comes first), with particular attention to breast and thyroid exam
Clinical breast exam, every 6–12 month, starting at age 25 y or 5–10 y before the earliest known breast cancer in the family	Annual thyroid starting at age 18 y or 5–10 y before the earliest known thyroid cancer in the family, whichever is earlier
Annual mammography and breast MRI screening starting at age 30–35 y or individualized based on earliest age of onset in family	Colonoscopy, starting at age 35 y, then every 5 y or more frequently if patient is symptomatic or polyps found
For endometrial cancer screening, encourage patient education and prompt response to symptoms and participation in a clinical trial to determine the effectiveness or necessity of screening modalities	Consider renal ultrasound starting at age 40 y, then every 1–2 y
Discuss risk-reducing mastectomy and hysterectomy and counsel regarding degree of protection, extent of cancer risk and reconstruction options	Dermatological management may be indicated for some patients
Address psychosocial, social, and quality-of-life aspects of undergoing risk-reducing mastectomy and/or hysterectomy	Consider psychomotor assessment in children at diagnosis and brain MRI if there are symptoms
	Education regarding the signs and symptoms of cancer

== Treatment ==
Malignancies that occur in Cowden syndrome are usually treated in the same fashion as those that occur sporadically in patients without a hereditary cancer syndrome. Two notable exceptions are breast and thyroid cancer. In Cowden syndrome patients with a first-time diagnosis of breast cancer, treatment with mastectomy of the involved breast as well as prophylactic mastectomy of the uninvolved contralateral breast should be considered. In the setting of thyroid cancer or a follicular adenoma, a total thyroidectomy (as opposed to a hemithyroidectomy, in which only one lobe of the thyroid would be removed) is recommended even in cases where it appears that only one lobe of the thyroid is affected. This is due to the high likelihood of recurrence as well as the difficulty in distinguishing a benign from malignant growth with a hemithyroidectomy alone.

The benign mucocutaneous lesions observed in Cowden syndrome are typically not treated unless they become symptomatic or disfiguring, as these lesions have little to no risk of metastasis. If the benign lesions do cause symptoms, numerous treatment options, including topical agents, cryosurgery, curettage, laser ablation, and excision, may be utilized.

== History ==
Cowden Syndrome was described in 1963, when Lloyd and Dennis described a novel inherited disease that predisposed to cancer. It was named after the Cowden family, in which it was discovered. They described the various clinical features including "adenoid facies; hypoplasia of the mandible and maxilla; a high-arch palate; hypoplasia of the soft palate and uvula; microstomia; papillomatosis of the lips and oral pharynx; scrotal tongue; [and] multiple thyroid adenomas."

The genetic basis of Cowden Syndrome was revealed in 1997, when germline mutations in a locus at 10q23 were associated to the novel PTEN tumor suppressor.

== See also ==
- List of cutaneous neoplasms associated with systemic syndromes
