= Malignant acrospiroma =

- Other names: Nodular hidradenocarcinoma, malignant nodular clear-cell hidradenoma, mucoepidermoid hidradenocarcinoma, clear-cell hidradenocarcinoma, malignant clear-cell acrospiroma, and clear-cell eccrine carcinoma.
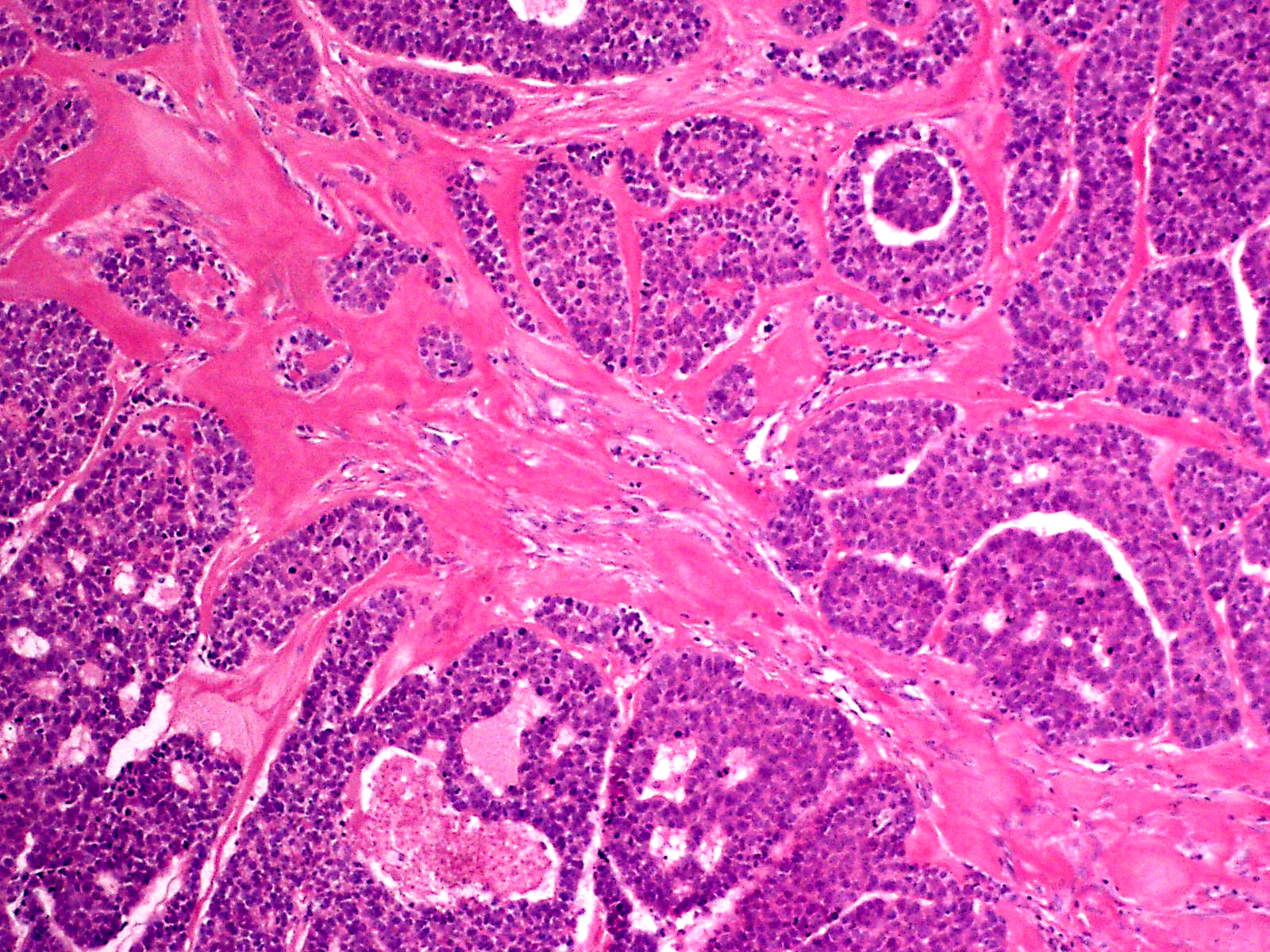

Malignant acrospiroma, also known as nodular hidradenocarcinoma, malignant nodular clear-cell hidradenoma, mucoepidermoid hidradenocarcinoma, clear-cell hidradenocarcinoma, malignant clear-cell acrospiroma, and clear-cell eccrine carcinoma, is a rare and aggressive tumour of the eccrine sweat glands. It was first documented by Keasbey and Hadley in 1954.

Lesions manifest as slow growing 0.5 to 10 cm nodules that may drain or ulcerate. Malignant acrospiroma can develop de novo or from a pre-existing benign lesion.

The diagnosis of malignant acrospiroma is primarily based on histological, immunohistochemical, or ultrastructural characteristics. The differential diagnosis includes trichilemmal carcinoma, sebaceous carcinoma, clear cell changes in squamous cell carcinoma, basal cell carcinoma, balloon cell melanoma, porocarcinoma, and metastatic renal clear cell carcinoma.

Malignant acrospiroma is treated with wide surgical excision. It has a 50% chance of recurrence and 60% chance of metastasis in the first 2 years.

Malignant acrospiroma usually presents around the age of 50 and has no strong gender preference. Malignant acrospiromas account for around 6% of all malignant eccrine tumors.

== Signs and symptoms ==
Usually, lesions appear as slow-growing nodules that have the potential to drain and ulcerate. Their sizes vary from 0.5 to 10 cm. Typically, they affect the head, neck, and limbs; the breasts and chest are less frequently affected.

== Causes ==
Malignant acrospiromas can develop spontaneously or evolve from a preexisting benign lesion.

== Diagnosis ==
The diagnosis of malignant acrospiroma is primarily based on histological, immunohistochemical, or ultrastructural characteristics.

Histological traits include a pronounced nodular (lobular) pattern. Normally, there is no link between the epidermis and the tumour, but the superficial epithelium may become ulcerated. The tumour may have enhanced mitotic activity and localized regions of necrosis.

The differential diagnosis for malignant acrospiroma includes additional cancers with clear cell changes, such as trichilemmal carcinoma, sebaceous carcinoma, clear cell changes in squamous cell carcinoma, basal cell carcinoma, balloon cell melanoma, porocarcinoma, and metastatic renal clear cell carcinoma.

== Treatment ==
The primary therapeutic method is wide surgical excision. Because of the aggressive nature and proclivity for lymphatic invasion, several authors suggest prophylactic lymph node dissection. Adjuvant chemotherapy's effectiveness is not well established.

== Outlook ==
Within the first two years, the tumour has a 50% chance of local recurrence and a 60% chance of metastatic spread. Disease-free 5-year survival rates have been reported to be less than 30%.

== Epidemiology ==
Malignant acrospiromas account for around 6% of all malignant eccrine tumours. The disease typically appears in middle ages. There does not appear to be a clear gender preponderance, despite some reports suggesting that malignant acrospiromas are more common in women.

== See also ==
- Acrospiroma
- Syringoma
- Hidrocystoma
