= Trichilemmal carcinoma =

- Other names: Tricholemmal carcinoma
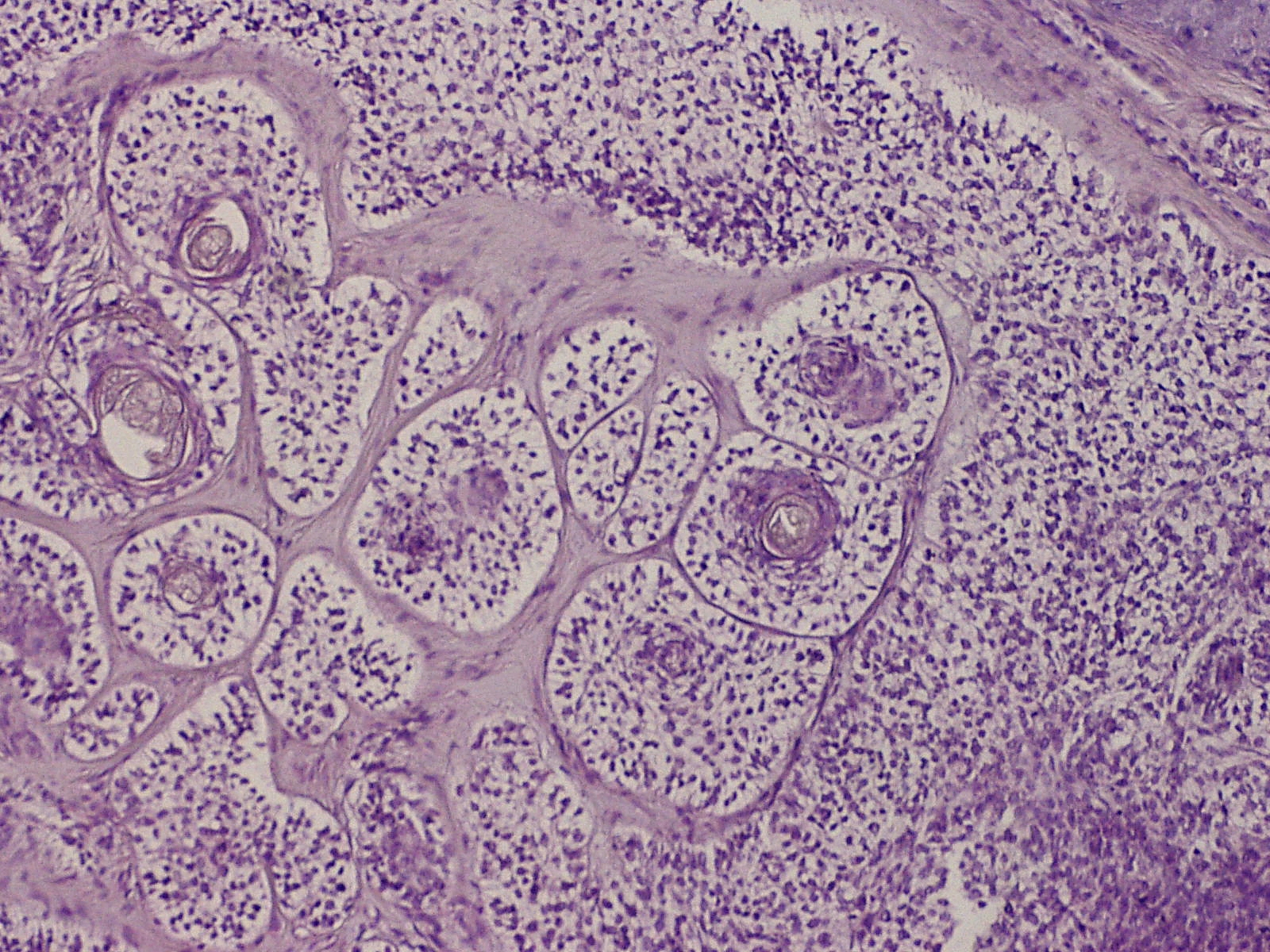
- Specialty: Oncology, dermatology

Trichilemmal carcinoma is a cutaneous condition reported to arise on sun-exposed areas, most commonly the face and ears.

== See also ==
- Trichilemmoma
- Skin lesion

A similar tumor, although in the nail bed, is called onycholemmal.
