= Marie Unna hereditary hypotrichosis =

- Other names: Marie Unna hypotrichosis
- Marie Unna hereditary hypotrichosis is an autosomal dominant disorder.
- Specialty: Medical genetics

Marie Unna hereditary hypotrichosis is an autosomal dominant condition characterized by scalp hair that is sparse or absent at birth, with variable coarse, wiry hair regrowth in childhood, and potential loss again at puberty.

== See also ==
- List of cutaneous conditions
