= CYLD (gene) =

Protein-coding gene in the species Homo sapiens

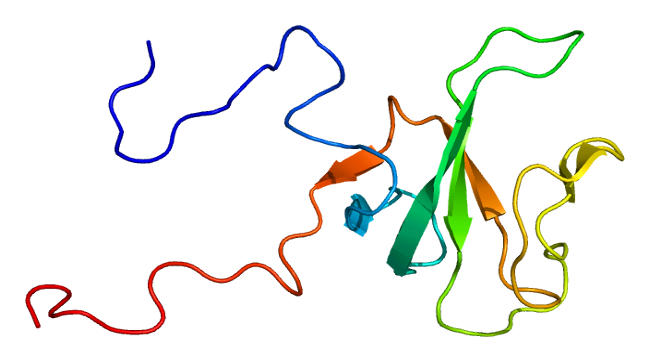

Identifiers
- Aliases: CYLD, BRSS, CDMT, CYLD1, CYLDI, EAC, MFT, MFT1, SBS, TEM, USPL2, CYLD lysine 63 deubiquitinase
- External IDs: OMIM: 605018; MGI: 1921506; GeneCards: CYLD
Available structures
PDB	Ortholog search: PDBe RCSB
PDB	List of PDB id codes 1IXD, 1WHL, 1WHM, 2VHF
Enzyme activity
EC #	BRENDA	ExPASy	KEGG	MetaCyc
3.4.19.12	↗	↗	↗	↗

Gene location (Human)
Chr.	Chromosome 16 (human)
Band	16q12.1	Start	50,742,050 bp
Band	16q12.1	End	50,801,935 bp

Gene location (Mouse)
Chr.	Chromosome 8 (mouse)
Band	8|8 C3	Start	89,423,656 bp
Band	8|8 C3	End	89,478,573 bp
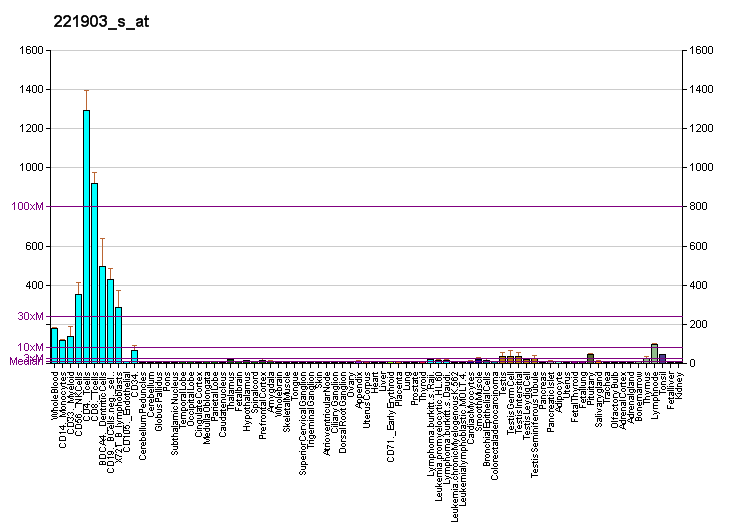

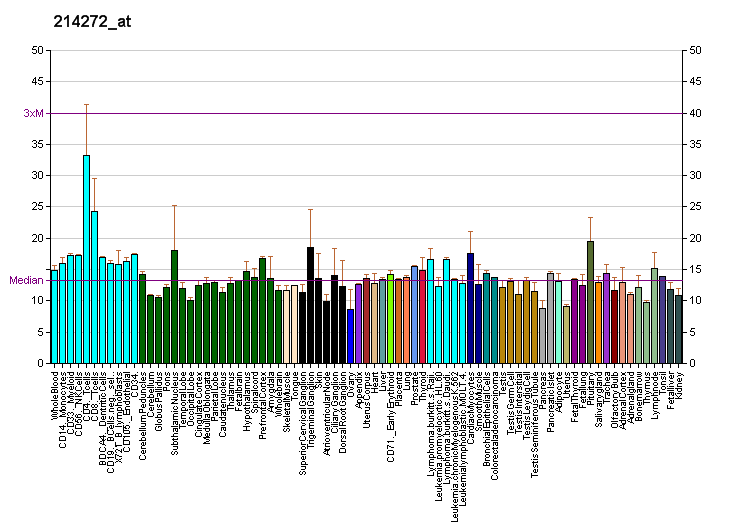

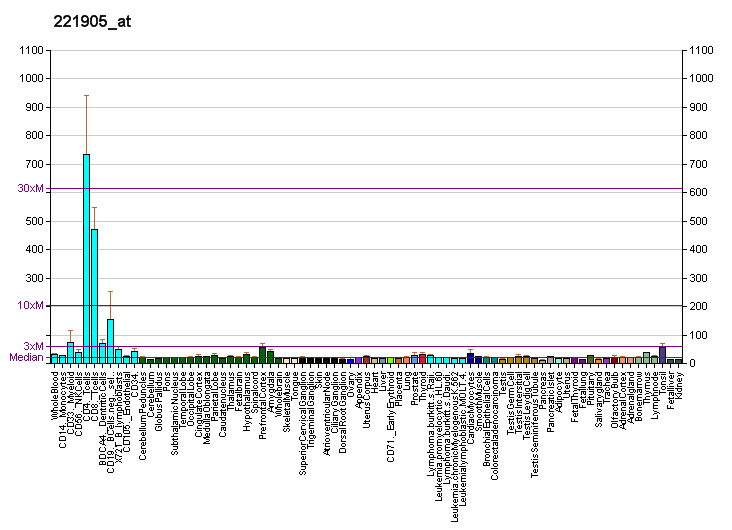
RNA expression pattern
Bgee	Human / Mouse (ortholog); Top expressed in: lateral nuclear group of thalamus; Achilles tendon; lymph node; cartilage tissue; external globus pallidus; sperm; middle temporal gyrus; pars reticulata; tonsil; pars compacta / Top expressed in: otolith organ; utricle; olfactory tubercle; nucleus accumbens; lateral septal nucleus; mesenteric lymph nodes; ventromedial nucleus; anterior amygdaloid area; otic vesicle; medial geniculate nucleus; More reference expression data
BioGPS	More reference expression data
Gene ontology
Molecular function	cysteine-type peptidase activity; zinc ion binding; metal ion binding; peptidase activity; protein binding; thiol-dependent deubiquitinase; proline-rich region binding; hydrolase activity; protein kinase binding; Lys63-specific deubiquitinase activity; Lys48-specific deubiquitinase activity; structural constituent of ribosome
Cellular component	cytoplasm; cytosol; centrosome; cell projection; membrane; extrinsic component of cytoplasmic side of plasma membrane; plasma membrane; spindle; microtubule organizing center; midbody; perinuclear region of cytoplasm; cytoplasmic microtubule; cytoskeleton; microtubule; ciliary basal body; ciliary tip
Biological process	regulation of intrinsic apoptotic signaling pathway; ubiquitin-dependent protein catabolic process; regulation of microtubule cytoskeleton organization; Wnt signaling pathway; proteolysis; protein K63-linked deubiquitination; regulation of mitotic cell cycle; positive regulation of extrinsic apoptotic signaling pathway; cell cycle; negative regulation of type I interferon production; negative regulation of NF-kappaB transcription factor activity; nucleotide-binding oligomerization domain containing signaling pathway; negative regulation of canonical Wnt signaling pathway; immune system process; regulation of tumor necrosis factor-mediated signaling pathway; protein deubiquitination; CD4-positive or CD8-positive, alpha-beta T cell lineage commitment; regulation of protein binding; innate immune response; regulation of B cell differentiation; negative regulation of T cell differentiation; positive regulation of T cell differentiation; homeostasis of number of cells; positive regulation of T cell receptor signaling pathway; necroptosis; protein K48-linked deubiquitination; ripoptosome assembly involved in necroptotic process; regulation of cilium assembly; positive regulation of protein localization; protein linear deubiquitination; cytoplasmic translation; negative regulation of NIK/NF-kappaB signaling; negative regulation of JNK cascade; negative regulation of p38MAPK cascade; regulation of inflammatory response; regulation of necroptotic process
Sources:Amigo / QuickGO
Orthologs
Databases	NCBI: entry; OMA: entry
Species	Human	Mouse
Entrez	1540	74256
Ensembl	ENSG00000083799	ENSMUSG00000036712
UniProt	Q9NQC7	Q80TQ2
RefSeq (mRNA)	NM_001042355; NM_001042412; NM_015247	NM_001128169; NM_001128170; NM_001128171; NM_001276279; NM_173369
RefSeq (protein)	NP_001035814; NP_001035877; NP_056062; NP_001365672; NP_001365673 NP_001365674; NP_001365675; NP_001365676; NP_001365677; NP_001365678; NP_001365679; NP_001365680; NP_001365681; NP_001365682; NP_001365683; NP_001365684; NP_001035814.1; NP_001035877.1	NP_001121642; NP_001121643; NP_001263208; NP_775545
Location (UCSC)	Chr 16: 50.74 – 50.8 Mb	Chr 8: 89.42 – 89.48 Mb
PubMed search
- Wikidata
View/Edit Human	View/Edit Mouse

The CYLD lysine 63 deubiquitinase gene, also termed the CYLD gene, CYLD is an evolutionary ancient gene found to be present as far back on the evolutionary scale as in sponges. In humans, this gene is located in band 12.1 on the long (or "q") arm of chromosome 16 and is known to code (i.e. direct the production of) multiple proteins through the process of alternative splicing.

== Function ==
The CYLD gene in known to code for a cytoplasmic protein, termed CYLD lysine 63 deubiquitinase (here termed CYLD protein), which has three cytoskeletal-associated protein-glycine-conserved (CAP-GLY) domains (areas or the protein controlling critical functions). CYLD protein is a deubiquitinating enzyme, i.e. a protease that removes ubiquitin from certain proteins and thereby regulates these proteins' activities. CYLD protein removes ubiquitin from proteins involved in regulating the NF-κB, Wnt, notch, TGF-β, and JNK cell signaling pathways; these pathways normally act to regulate hair formation, cell growth, cell survival, inflammatory responses, and/or tumor development. In the brain, CYLD is recruited to the post-synaptic density in response to neuronal excitation. In the neuron, it modulates autophagy through activation of the AKT-mTOR cell signaling pathway, and synaptic plasticity by removing lysine 63 ubiquitin chains from the synaptic scaffold protein PSD-95.

== Clinical significance ==
The CYLD gene is classified as a tumor suppressor gene, i.e. a gene that regulates cell growth and when inactivated by a mutation leads to uncontrolled cell growth and the formation of tumors. Inactivating mutations in this gene occur in essentially all cases of the CYLD cutaneous syndrome, a hereditary disorder in which individuals develop multiple skin tumors. The CYLD cutaneous syndrome includes three somewhat different forms of the disease: the multiple familial trichoepithelioma-type, Brooke–Spiegler syndrome-type, and familial cylindromatosis-type. CYLD gene mutations are also associated with T-Cell Acute Lymphoblastic Leukemia, multiple myeloma, hepatocellular carcinoma, neuroblastoma, pancreatic cancer, uterine cancer, stomach cancer, colon cancer, lung cancer, human papillomavirus-associated cancers, and amyotrophic lateral sclerosis.
