= Brian L. Strom =

American academic

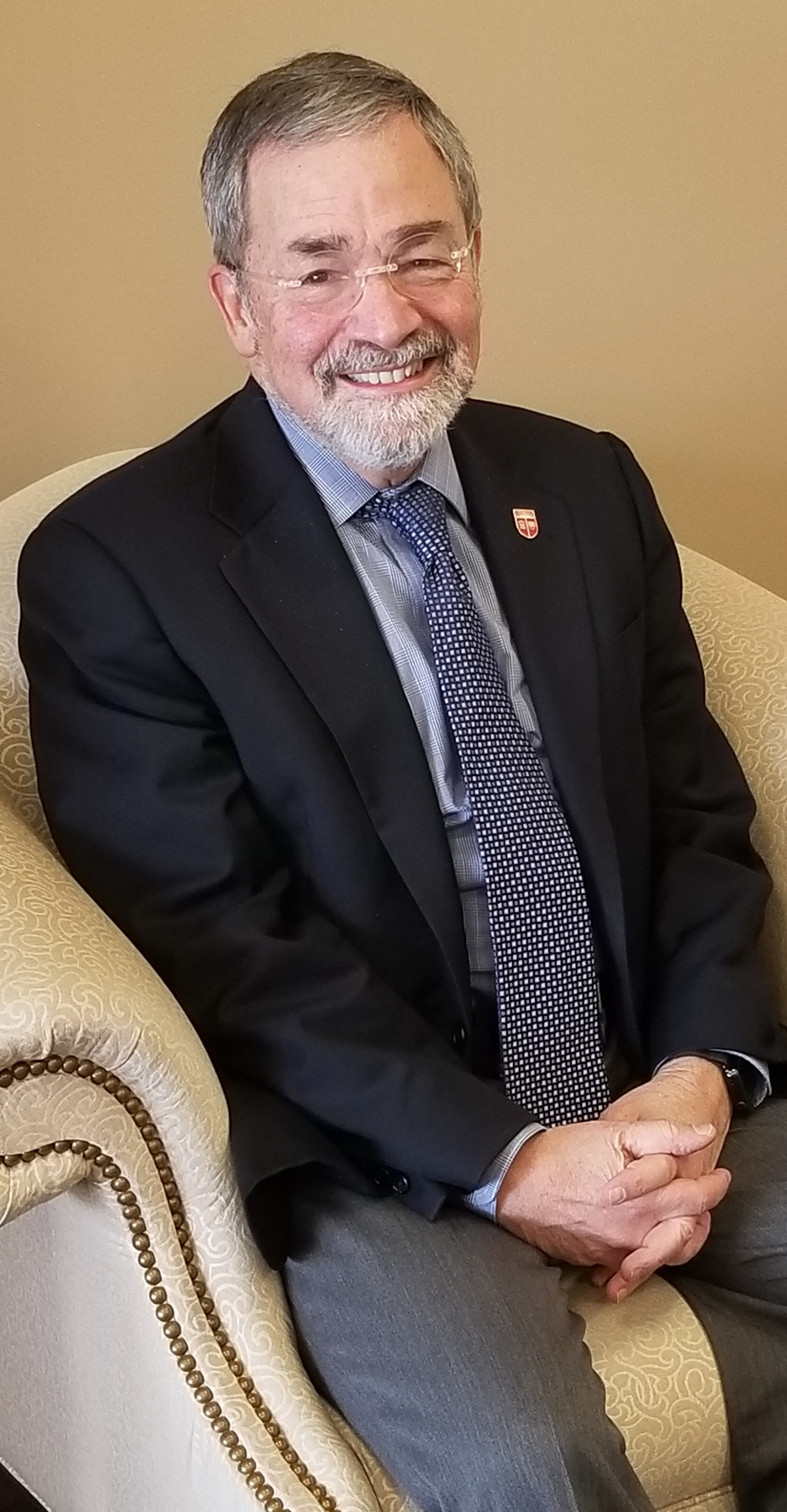
- Chancellor Brian L. Strom

1st Chancellor of Rutgers Health
- In office December 2, 2013 – December 31, 2025
- Preceded by: Office established
- Succeeded by: Robert L. Johnson (Interim)

Personal details
- Born: December 8, 1949 (age 76) New York, New York
- Spouse: Elaine Strom
- Children: 2
- Education: Yale University (B.S.); The Johns Hopkins University School of Medicine (M.D.); University of California, Berkeley (M.P.H.)

Brian L. Strom (born December 8, 1949) is an American physician, epidemiologist, and academic leader. Beginning in 2013, he served as the inaugural Chancellor of Rutgers Biomedical and Health Sciences (RBHS), later branded as Rutgers Health, and as Executive Vice President for Health Affairs and University Professor at Rutgers University. He is widely recognized as a founder of the field of pharmacoepidemiology and for his contributions to clinical research training, drug safety research, and academic health system creation.

Prior to joining Rutgers, Strom held multiple senior leadership and founding roles at the Perelman School of Medicine of the University of Pennsylvania, including Executive Vice Dean for Institutional Affairs; Founding Chair of the Department of Biostatistics and Epidemiology; Founding Director of the Center for Clinical Epidemiology and Biostatistics (CCEB); and Founding Director of the Graduate Program in Epidemiology and Biostatistics. He has authored more than 660 peer-reviewed publications and 18 books and has served as principal investigator on more than 277 research grants. He was named among Best Doctors in America each year during the final eight years of his tenure at the University of Pennsylvania.

== Early life and education ==
Brian Leslie Strom was born on December 8, 1949, in New York City. He grew up Floral Park, New York and attended Martin Van Buren High School in Queens Village. As an undergraduate, Strom attended Yale University, where he earned his Bachelor of Science degree in molecular biophysics and biochemistry. After graduating, he received his Doctor of Medicine at The Johns Hopkins University School of Medicine. Following his medical internship and residency in Internal Medicine at University of California, San Francisco, he earned a Master of Public Health degree in Epidemiology from the University of California, Berkeley while concurrently serving as an National Institutes of Health Research Fellow in Clinical Pharmacology at the University of California, San Francisco.

== Career ==
=== University of Pennsylvania ===
Strom joined the faculty of the University of Pennsylvania in 1980. At Penn, he founded the Center for Clinical Epidemiology and Biostatistics (CCEB), which grew to include more than 550 faculty members, research staff, trainees, and support personnel. At the time he stepped down from leadership, CCEB research funding totaled nearly $49 million annually, with an overall budget of approximately $67 million.

Strom also developed graduate and postgraduate training programs in epidemiology and biostatistics, including a Master of Science program in clinical epidemiology. More than 625 clinicians completed training through these programs, the majority of whom went on to academic or research-focused careers. He served as principal investigator or co-principal investigator on 11 NIH-funded training grants (including T32, D43, K12, and K30 mechanisms) and was the primary mentor for more than 40 clinical research trainees.

Internationally, Strom was a key contributor to the conceptualization and early development of the International Clinical Epidemiology Network (INCLEN), founded in 1979 with support from the Rockefeller Foundation to provide clinical research training to clinicians in low- and middle-income countries. Penn was a founding INCLEN training center. During its initial phase (1979–1995), INCLEN supported the establishment of 26 clinical epidemiology units across Latin America, India, Africa, and Southeast Asia.

=== Rutgers University and Rutgers Health ===
In 2013, Strom was appointed the inaugural Chancellor of Rutgers Biomedical and Health Sciences following the dissolution of the University of Medicine and Dentistry of New Jersey (UMDNJ). RBHS, later rebranded as Rutgers Health, integrated eight schools and seven major centers and institutes, combining academic, research, and clinical enterprises across Rutgers University.

Under Strom’s leadership, Rutgers Health expanded to include approximately 2,500 employed faculty, 8,500 staff, 1,300 clinical providers, 1,700 residents, and 8,000 students, with an annual budget exceeding $2.5 billion. Research funding tripled during his tenure, surpassing $600 million annually and bringing more than $4 billion in extramural research funding to New Jersey. First quarter funding from the National Institutes of Health increased 30% in fiscal year 26, compared to what had been a record fiscal year 25.

When Strom assumed leadership, RBHS faced a projected annual operating deficit of approximately $54 million and a fund balance of $42 million. The organization achieved balanced budgets in every fiscal year following 2014, except for the first year of the COVID-19 pandemic and entered fiscal year 2026 with a fund balance of $461 million.

His twelve year tenure was notable for careful financial stewardship; recruitment of a new leadership team; numerous faculty recruitments; clarification of faculty expectations, enhancement of incentives, and broadened mentorship and development opportunities; a new focus on excellence, training, and interprofessional education; revitalized clinical partnerships; extensive promotion of community engagement and service; tremendous growth in research funding, institutional stature, and clinical trials; two strategic plans (2014–21 and 2022–27), with a focus on implementation and evaluation; new branding; a more rational academic, administrative, and financial restructuring of schools, institutes, and centers; new and renovated physical space; and an institutional response to the COVID-19 pandemic that was cited nationally as a model for academic health systems.

== Research ==
Strom's major research interest is in the field of pharmacoepidemiology, i.e., the application of epidemiologic methods to the study of drug use and effects. He is recognized as a founder of this field and for his pioneer work in using large, automated databases for research. He is editor of the field's major text (now in its seventh edition) and Editor-in-Chief for Pharmacoepidemiology and Drug Safety, the official journal of the International Society for Pharmacoepidemiology. As one of many specific contributions, his research was pivotal in prompting the American Heart Association and American Dental Association to reverse 50 years of guidelines and recommend against use of antibiotics to prevent infective endocarditis, instead of recommending for this widespread practice. In addition to writing more than 660 papers and 18 books, he has been principal investigator for more than 275 grants, including over $115 million in direct costs alone. Strom has been invited to give more than 465 talks outside his local area, including presentations as the keynote speaker for numerous international meetings. He has been a consultant to NIH, FDA, CDC, USP, AAMC, JCAHO, foreign governments, most major pharmaceutical manufacturers, and many law firms.

== Honors ==
- 1969 J. Willard Gibbs Society, Yale University
- 1974 Second Prize, Alfred A. Richman Essay Contest, American College of Chest Physicians
- 1983 Elected Fellow, American College of Physicians
- 1985 Elected Fellow, American College of Epidemiology
- 1988 M.A. (honoris causa), University of Pennsylvania
- 1990 Elected Member, American Epidemiological Society
- 1991 Elected Fellow, College of Physicians of Philadelphia
- 1992 Elected Member, American Society for Clinical Investigation
- 1992 Pfizer Visiting Professorship in Clinical Pharmacology, Georgetown University Medical Center
- 1992 University of Pennsylvania School of Medicine, Class of 1992 Class Teaching Award
- 1999 Naomi M. Kanof Clinical Investigator Award, Society for Investigative Dermatology
- 2000 Elected Member, Association of American Physicians
- 2001 Samuel Martin Health Evaluation Sciences Research Award
- 2001 Elected Member, Institute of Medicine of the National Academy of Sciences
- 2002 Commended Paper, ISPE - Pharmacoepidemiology and Drug Safety Best Article Award
- 2002 UPHS Quality Award for Reducing Antibiotic Use for Head Cold and Chest Cold
- 2002 Rawls-Palmer Progress in Medicine Award, American Society for Clinical Pharmacology and Therapeutics
- 2002 George S. Pepper Professor of Public Health and Preventive Medicine
- 2003 Charles C. Shepard Science Award, Centers for Disease Control and Prevention
- 2003 Elected Fellow, International Society of Pharmacoepidemiology
- 2003 Leonard M. Schumann Lecturer, University of Michigan School of Public Health, 38th Graduate Summer Session in Epidemiology
- 2003 National Academy of Sciences/National Research Council, National Associate
- 2003 The John M. Eisenberg Memorial Lecture, University of California at San Francisco
- 2004-05 Sigma Xi Distinguished Lecturer, Sigma Xi, The Scientific Research Society
- 2004 Christian R. and Mary F. Lindback Award for Distinguished Teaching, The Lindback Society
- 2005-2006 Recognized by Best Doctors in America
- 2006 Best Paper Award, Circulation
- 2006 Sustained Scientific Excellence Award, International Society for Pharmacoepidemiology
- 2007-2008 Recognized by Best Doctors in America
- 2008 John Phillips Memorial Award for Outstanding Work in Clinical Medicine, American College of Physicians
- 2008 Elected Fellow, American College of Preventive Medicine
- 2008 Harry Guess Memorial Lecture, The University of North Carolina School of Public Health Chapter of the International Society for Pharmacoepidemiology, Department of Epidemiology
- 2008 Winner, ISPE - Pharmacoepidemiology and Drug Safety Best Article Award
- 2008 Commended Paper, ISPE - Pharmacoepidemiology and Drug Safety Best Article Award
- 2009-2010 Recognized by Best Doctors in America
- 2009 UPHS Quality and Patient Safety Honorable Mention Award, University of Pennsylvania Health System
- 2011-2012 Recognized by Best Doctors in America
- 2011 National Associate of the National Academies
- 2012 Contraception Outstanding Article Award for 2012
- 2013 Association for Clinical and Translational Science/American Federation for Medical Research National Award for Career Achievement and Contribution to Clinical and Translational Science for translation from clinical use into public benefit and policy
- 2013 Dennis J. Sullivan Award, New Jersey Public Health Association
- 2014 Alpha Omega Alpha medical honor society
- 2016 Oscar B. Hunter Career Award in Therapeutics, American Society of Clinical Pharmacology and Therapeutics
- 2017 Honorary President, The Hellenic Society of Pharmacoepidemiology
- 2018 Honorary Doctorate, Democritus University of Thrace, Alexandropolis, Greece
- 2019 Roy A. Bowers Award, Rutgers Ernest Mario School of Pharmacy
- 2020 Fellow, American Association for the Advancement of Science
- 2022 Heart of BioNJ Award, New Jersey’s Go-to Expert and Epidemiologist in Educating the Community and Leading the Fight Against COVID-19 at Rutgers University and Beyond, COVID-19 Heroes Celebration
- 2023 Roy A. Bowers Award, Rutgers Ernest Mario School of Pharmacy
- 2024 Sigma Xi, The Scientific Research Honor Society
- 2024 New Jersey Innovate 100 Honoree
- 2025 Roy A. Bowers Award, Rutgers Ernest Mario School of Pharmacy
- 2025 Educator of the Year, Research and Development Council of New Jersey

== Selected publications ==
=== Books ===
- Strom BL (ed). Pharmacoepidemiology. New York: Churchill Livingstone, 1989.
- Strom BL, Velo GP (eds). Drug Epidemiology and Postmarketing Drug Surveillance. New York: Plenum Press, 1993.
- Strom BL (ed). Pharmacoepidemiology (Second Edition). Sussex: John Wiley, 1994.
- Strom BL (ed). Pharmacoepidemiology (Third Edition). Sussex: John Wiley, 2000.
- Joellenbeck LM, Zwanziger LL, Durch JS, Strom BL (eds). Committee to Assess the Safety and Efficacy of the Anthrax Vaccine, Medical Follow-up Agency. The Anthrax Vaccine: Is It Safe? Does It Work? Washington, DC: National Academy Press, 2002.
- Strom BL (ed). Pharmacoepidemiology (Fourth Edition). Sussex: John Wiley, 2005.
- Baciu A, Anason AP, Stratton K, Strom BL (eds). Committee on Smallpox Vaccination Program Implementation, Board on Health Promotion and Disease Prevention; The Smallpox Vaccination Program: Public Health in an Age of Terrorism. Washington, DC: The National Academies Press, 2005.
- Strom BL, Kimmel SE (eds). Textbook of Pharmacoepidemiology. Sussex: John Wiley, 2006.
- Strom BL, Kimmel SE, Hennessy S (eds). Pharmacoepidemiology (Fifth Edition). Sussex: John Wiley 2012.
- Strom BL, Yaktine AL, Oria M. Sodium Intake in Populations: Assessment of Evidence. Washington, DC: The National Academies Press, 2013.
- Strom BL, Kimmel SE, Hennessy S (eds). Textbook of Pharmacoepidemiology (Second Edition). Chichester: JohnWiley, 2013.
- Buckley GJ, Strom BL (eds). Committee on a National Strategy for the Elimination of Hepatitis B and C, Board on Population Health and Public Health Practice, Health and Medicine Division; Eliminating the Public Health Problem of Hepatitis B and C in the United States: Phase One Report. Washington, DC: The National Academies Press, 2016.
- Buckley GJ, Strom BL (eds). Committee on a National Strategy for the Elimination of Hepatitis B and C, Board on Population Health and Public Health Practice, Health and Medicine Division; Eliminating the Public Health Problem of Hepatitis B and C in the United States: Phase Two Report. Washington, DC: The National Academies Press, 2017.
- Strom BL, Kimmel SE, Hennessy SH (eds). Pharmacoepidemiology (Sixth Edition). John Wiley and Sons, 2019.
- Strom BL, Bohnert AS, Gerhard T, Hernan M, King VL, Lewis R, Merlin J, Paddock S (eds). An Approach to Evaluate the Effects on Concomitant Prescribing of Opioids and Benzodiazepines on Veteran Deaths and Suicides. The National Academies Press, 2019.
- Strom BL, Kimmel SE, Hennessy S (eds). Textbook of Pharmacoepidemiology (Third Edition). Chichester: John Wiley, 2022.
- Strom BL. Celebrating the largest higher education merger in U.S. history | Opinion. NJ Star Ledger, June 30, 2023.
- Strom BL, Doebler DA (eds). Veterans, Prescription Opioids and Benzodiazepines, and Mortality, 2007-2019, Three Target Trial Emulations. The National Academies Press, 2025.
