= James Oleske =

American pediatrician; one of the first to identify HIV in children

- Education: University of Detroit, New Jersey Medical School, Columbia University, Emory University School of Medicine
- Scientific career
- Fields: HIV/AIDS research, pediatrics
- Workplaces: Rutgers New Jersey Medical School

External videos
- “UMDNJ Legacy Dr. James Oleske, September 25, 2013, Rutgers Health

James M. Oleske is an American pediatrician and HIV/AIDS researcher who is the emeritus François-Xavier Bagnoud (FXB) Professor of Pediatrics at Rutgers New Jersey Medical School in Newark, New Jersey. He is best known for his pioneering work in identifying HIV/AIDS as a pediatric disease, and treating and researching it beginning in the 1980s. He published one of the first articles identifying HIV/AIDS in children in JAMA in 1983 and was a co-author of one of the articles by Robert Gallo and others identifying the virus in Science in 1984.

== Education ==
Raised on Oradell, New Jersey, Oleske attended Bergen Catholic High School and received his high school diploma in 1963. He earned a Bachelor of Science degree from the University of Detroit in 1967. He received his medical degree from New Jersey Medical School in 1971 at what was then the College of Medicine & Dentistry of New Jersey (CMDNJ), now known as Rutgers Health, where he later did an internship and residency in the Department of Pediatrics. He received a master's degree in Public Health from Columbia University in 1974 and completed a fellowship in Pediatric Infectious Diseases & Immunology at Emory University Medical School in 1976.

== Career ==
Oleske was a pediatrician in Newark, New Jersey, in the 1970s when little was known about how HIV/AIDS was transmitted. In the late 1970s, Oleske began noticing an unusual increase in the number of pediatric patients at his hospital with suppressed immune systems and life-threatening infections. In 1981, Oleske was asked to draw blood from an adult male patient at Saint Michael’s Medical Center who was a recovering IV drug user and who was suffering from what would later be known as AIDS. The patient immediately recognized Oleske and was surprised that the doctor did not know who he was. The patient told Oleske that he was the father of one of the doctor's pediatric patients. His young daughter had a severe immune disorder and died six months earlier from Pneumocystis carinii pneumonia (PCP). Oleske hadn't recognized the young girl’s father because he had looked robust and healthy only a few months ago and was now severely ill and underweight. This encounter made Oleske realize that the dying man, his daughter, and other immune-deficient pediatric patients at the hospital were suffering from the same illness.

Doctors Oleske, Anthony Minnefor and Franklin Desposito were among the authors of an article about pediatric AIDS in the Journal of the American Medical Association (JAMA) in 1983. The article received criticism from the medical community because at the time the new immune deficiency was known to infect adults only through sexual contact, blood transfusion, and intravenous drug use. Because of the stigma surrounding AIDS, Oleske struggled to convince others that the disease could be transmitted to children and struggled to obtain funding to support pediatric AIDS research and treatment in Newark. Oleske often complained that most of the federal money went to prestigious institutions that didn't have any patients suffering from the disease.

In 1987, Oleske and nurse practitioner Mary G. Boland co-founded the Children’s Hospital AIDS Program (CHAP) at Children’s Hospital of New Jersey

The Littlest Victims, a docudrama about Oleske and his work, was broadcast on national television in 1989. The program helped bring much needed awareness to the suffering of children in Newark, and unexpected funding and support. After seeing the television program, Albina du Boisrouvray, a French Countess, contacted Oleske and offered him a $1.25 million donation. Throughout the years, she continued supporting AIDS research in Newark by endowing a professorship at the University of Medicine and Dentistry of New Jersey (UMDNJ) and providing funding to support UMDNJ’s clinical pediatric AIDS program at the United Hospitals Medical Center of Newark. Funding from Du Boisrouvrary helped establish the Francois-Xavier Bagnoud (FXB) Clinical Care Center, named in honor of her deceased son, at the UMDNJ campus. FXB pioneered perinatal and pediatric AIDS care and clinical research and established the first international training program for medical professionals who treat HIV-infected pregnant women.

Oleske is a co-founder of Circle of Life Children's Center, a palliative care program for children with serious terminal diseases. Circle of Life was formed in 2002, with Lynn Czarniecki. Oleske served as Director of the Center.

Oleske is known for carrying a stuffed rabbit in the pocket of his lab coat and for giving stuffed rabbits to pediatric patients to provide comfort during medical procedures and hospital stays. He began this practice after receiving a purple stuffed rabbit from a young HIV patient. The patient died shortly thereafter, and Oleske continued the practice in his memory.

A documentary entitled Don Quixote in Newark about Oleske and his struggle to identify and treat pediatric AIDS was broadcast on PBS in 2022.

== Awards ==
- Lifetime Achievement Award, American Academy of Pediatrics for “contributions in advancing the prevention, diagnoses and treatment of Pediatric HIV/AIDS.”
