= University Hospital (Newark, New Jersey) =

Geography
- Location: 150 Bergen St., Newark, New Jersey, United States
- Coordinates: 40.7403°N 74.1902°W

Organization
- Type: Teaching
- Affiliated university: New Jersey Medical School

Services
- Emergency department: Level I Adult Trauma Center / Level II Pediatric Trauma Center
- Beds: 518

Helipads
- Helipad: FAA LID: NJ87

History
- Founded: 1981

Links
- Website: http://www.uhnj.org
- Lists: Hospitals in New Jersey

University Hospital is an independent, state owned, teaching hospital in Newark, New Jersey that provides tertiary care to Northern New Jersey. The hospital is certified by the American College of Surgeons and is a state-designated Level 1 Trauma Center.

== Overview ==
University Hospital is an independent, standalone medical center owned by the State of New Jersey and governed by a board headed by Sarah Adelman. It is located in the University Heights section of Newark, New Jersey. University Hospital is a principal teaching hospital for Rutgers Health and a regional resource for specialized services and critical care. It is the largest provider of uncompensated care in New Jersey. University hospital was ranked among the best hospitals in Northern New Jersey, published by U.S. News Report, a Gold Plus Performance Achievement in Heart Failure/Stroke from the American Heart Association and is fully accredited by the Joint Commission.

== History ==
The hospital was founded as Newark City Hospital, which first opened on September 4, 1882 with 25 beds. The College of the Medicine and Dentistry of New Jersey assumed operation of the hospital from the City in 1968 following the civil unrest of 1967 and renamed the entire complex Martland Hospital as part of an agreement with the City of Newark. The College of Medicine and Dentistry entered into what is known as the "Newark Agreement" which agreed to continue to provide healthcare and employment opportunities to Newark residents which is in perpetuity. The expansion of the College prompted the construction of a new hospital; and College Hospital opened in May 1979. The name was changed to University Hospital in 1981 to recognize the awarding of university status to the college by the state legislature. In November 2012, the New Jersey Medical and Health Sciences Education Restructuring Act provided for most schools and units of the University of Medicine and Dentistry of New Jersey to be transferred to Rutgers, The State University of New Jersey. With this legislation, in July 2013 University Hospital became an independent, standalone medical center owned by the state based upon the Newark Agreement of 1968.

In popular culture, the documentary film Don Quixote of Newark profiled the work done by James Oleske, Mary Boland and others in this urban hospital to learn more about and show compassion to children who were affected with AIDS and HIV.

== Controversy and scandals ==
The University of Medicine and Dentistry was involved in a series of adverse circumstances related to over-billing Medicaid from 2001 to 2004. A number of systemic reforms were initiated. Legislation of 2012 separated University Hospital from UMDNJ, and the transition was successfully completed in July 2013.

== In popular culture ==
ABC documentary series NY Med, produced by ABC News, features University Hospital.

University Hospital Awards
