= Graduate School of Biomedical Sciences =

Graduate School of Biomedical Sciences may refer to:

- Texas A&M University Graduate School of Biomedical Sciences in College Station, Texas
- Rutgers University Graduate School of Biomedical Sciences in Newark, New Jersey
- Rowan University Graduate School of Biomedical Sciences in Stratford, New Jersey
- Graduate School of Biomedical Sciences in Galveston, Texas
- UNT Graduate School of Biomedical Sciences in Fort Worth, Texas
