= Pharmacoepidemiology and Drug Safety =

- Discipline: Pharmacoepidemiology
- Language: English
- Edited by: Brian L. Strom

Publication details
- History: 1992–present
- Publisher: Wiley
- Frequency: Monthly
- Impact factor: 2.6 (2022)

Standard abbreviations
- ISO 4: Pharmacoepidemiol. Drug Saf.

Indexing
- CODEN: PDSAEA
- ISSN: 1053-8569 (print); 1099-1557 (web)
- OCLC no.: 22683758

Links
- Journal homepage

Pharmacoepidemiology and Drug Safety is a peer-reviewed scientific journal covering aspects of pharmacoepidemiology. It was established in 1992 and is published by Wiley on behalf of the International Society for Pharmacoepidemiology. The editor-in-chief is Brian L. Strom at Rutgers University.

== Abstracting and indexing ==
According to Wiley, the Impact factor of the journal is 2.6.
