= Stanley S. Bergen Jr. =

President of the University of Medicine and Dentistry of New Jersey
- In office 1971–1998
- Preceded by: Inaugural holder
- Succeeded by: Stuart D. Cook

Senior Vice President of the New York City Health and Hospitals Corporation
- In office 1970–1971

Personal details
- Born: Stanley Silvers Bergen Jr. May 2, 1929 Princeton, New Jersey, U.S.
- Died: April 24, 2019 (aged 89) Stonington, Maine
- Spouse(s): Suzanne E. Miller (m. 1965–present)
- Children: Steven Richard; Victoria Hilles; Stuart Bergen; Stanley Silvers III; Amy Dorle
- Education: Princeton University (AB); Columbia University (MD)
- Profession: Physician; University president University professor

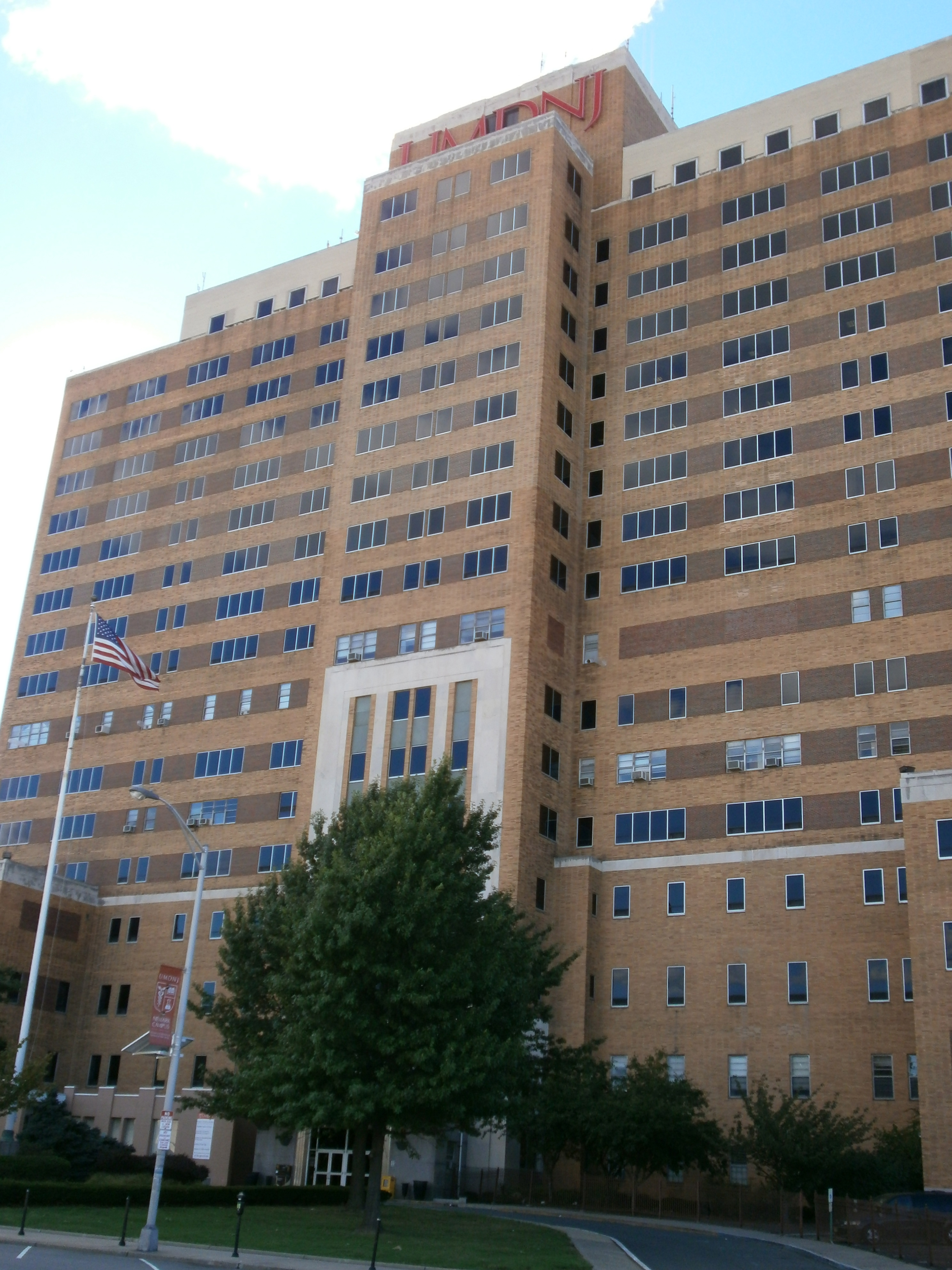
The Dr. Stanley S. Bergen Building in Newark, New Jersey

Stanley Silvers Bergen Jr. (May 2, 1929 – April 24, 2019) was an American physician, healthcare educator and administrator, and university president. In 1971, he became the founding president of the incipient College of Medicine and Dentistry of New Jersey which he developed into the University of Medicine and Dentistry of New Jersey (UMDNJ) serving at its helm until his retirement in 1998. While he was president, UMDNJ became the nation's largest public health and science university, home to three medical schools and several allied medical health facilities.

== Biography ==
Stanley S. Bergen was born on May 2, 1929, in Princeton, New Jersey. He earned his undergraduate degree from Princeton University in New Jersey and his medical degree from Columbia College of Physicians and Surgeons in 1955. He completed his residency in internal medicine at Philadelphia General Hospital and his fellowship in hematology at the University of California, San Francisco. Bergen served in the New Jersey National Guard and was recalled into the Army as a doctor after finishing his medical education. He served at Fort Jay on Governors Island in New York Harbor.

Bergen served as Medical Director at St. Luke's Hospital, New York, from 1962 to 1964 and as chief of community medicine at Brooklyn-Cumberland Center, New York, from 1968 to 1970. In 1970, Bergen became the Senior Vice President of the New York City Health and Hospitals Corporation. One year later, he was appointed as the founding President of the newly established College of Medicine and Dentistry of New Jersey (CMDNJ), later renamed University of Medicine and Dentistry of New Jersey (UMDNJ).

During his tenure at UMDNJ, Bergen oversaw the growth and development of the institution into the largest public health sciences university in the country, with more than 6,000 students and 14,000 employees. University status was achieved in 1981, and eventually, the institution encompassed eight schools on five campuses, with a major teaching hospital in Newark and affiliations with more than 200 healthcare and higher education institutions within the state. UMDNJ had one of the largest student minority populations among medical and dental schools nationwide and implemented a long list of community service programs. Bergen led the creation of the UMDNJ Foundation, which raised funds to support research and education at the university and was instrumental in creating the Cancer Institute of New Jersey. In 2013, UMDNJ became the basis of Rutgers Biomedical and Health Sciences of Rutgers University, as most of its components were integrated.

Bergen was a prominent advocate for academic medicine and healthcare policy. He was an early and staunch believer that health care is a basic human right. Bergen served on numerous national committees and task forces, including the Institute of Medicine, the National Institutes of Health, and the Association of American Medical Colleges. He was also a member of the Board of Directors of the Robert Wood Johnson Foundation and the American Hospital Association.

After retirement, Bergen continued to be involved in healthcare and education as a consultant and advisor. He died in Stonington, Maine, on April 24, 2019, at the age of 89.

== Honors and awards ==
- The Dr. Stanley S. Bergen Building in Newark, New Jersey is named in his honor.
- Distinguished Alumni Award from the University of Pennsylvania School of Medicine, the Dr. Nathan Davis Award from the American Medical Association, and the Gold Medal Award from the Medical Society of New Jersey.
- Multiple honorary doctorates, including a Legum Doctor from Princeton University.
- The Stanley S. Bergen Medal of Excellence was created to reward achievements in medical science and education.
