= Mary G. Boland =

American Pediatric Nurse and Doctor of Public Health

Mary Goretti Boland
- Born: Ireland
- Education: University of Pennsylvania, Seton Hall University, Columbia University
- Scientific career
- Fields: HIV/AIDS research, pediatrics, public health
- Workplaces: Children's Hospital of New Jersey, Rutgers New Jersey Medical School, Nancy Atmosphera-Walsh School of Nursing University of Hawaiʻi at Mānoa

Mary Goretti Boland is an American pediatric nurse and academic. She is nationally known for her work developing innovative healthcare programs for underserved children with HIV/AIDS and other chronic diseases. Boland was a professor of nursing and Associate Dean at the Rutgers University College of Nursing. She also co-founded and was director of its interdisciplinary François-Xavier Bagnoud Center. Boland was Dean of the Nancy Atmospera-Walsh School of Nursing at the University of Hawaiʻi at Mānoa from 2005 to 2021. She is a Fellow of the American Academy of Nursing.

== Early life and education ==
Boland was born in Ireland and raised in Pennsylvania. She received her bachelor's degree in nursing from the University of Pennsylvania, and a master's degree in pediatric nursing from Seton Hall University. She holds a Doctor of Public Health degree from the Mailman School of Public Health at Columbia University.

== Career ==
Boland began her career as a nurse practitioner staffing a mobile health screening van that provided screening tests, immunizations, health education and followup care at no cost for children in the Ironbound neighborhood of Newark.

In 1987, she co-founded the Children's Hospital AIDS Program (CHAP) at Children's Hospital of New Jersey with Dr. James Oleske . Boland became the director of the AIDS program. In that role, Boland advocated with Anthony Fauci for children with AIDS to participate in clinical trials of experimental drugs. While director, she also helped to coordinate the Children's AIDS program (CHAP) at United Hospitals Medical Center in Newark and developed an intensive month-long training program in pediatric AIDS, drawing doctors and nurses internationally from countries including Cuba, South America, Europe, Myanmar, Africa and the former Soviet Union.

Boland served on the New Jersey Pediatric AIDS Advisory Committee under governor Christine Todd Whitman. In 1989, as committee chair, she published the report Generations in Jeopardy: Responding to HIV in Children, Women and Adolescents in New Jersey. In 1995, she co-edited Children, Families, and HIV/AIDS: Psychosocial and Therapeutic Issues, outlining a family-centered approach to AIDS care.

In 1995, she was also named to the National AIDS Advisory Committee by President Bill Clinton.

In 1996, Boland became the first nurse to hold a named chair at the School of Nursing of the University of Medicine and Dentistry of New Jersey (later Rutgers University College of Nursing). She served as Associate Dean for community programs at the Rutgers University College of Nursing. With Oleske, Boland founded the François-Xavier Bagnoud Center, an interdisciplinary center at the medical school and became its director.

Boland was the Dean of the Nancy Atmospera-Walsh School of Nursing at the University of Hawaiʻi at Mānoa from 2005 to 2021, and the longest serving dean in the school's history.

== Awards ==
On July 14, 1988, Boland was the recipient of a special award from the U.S. Department of Health and Human Services for her work in pediatric AIDS/HIV treatment.

In 1996, she and Oleske received the New Jersey State Nurses Association's President's Award for commitment and dedication to nursing and quality health care.

In 2017, Boland received an Executive Award from the Healthcare Association of Hawaii.

== Selected publications ==
- Davis KF, Loos JR, Boland MG. Five Years and Moving Forward: A Successful Joint Academic-Practice Public Partnership to Improve the Health of Hawaii's Schoolchildren. J Sch Health. 2021 July;91(7): pages 584–591. doi:10.1111/josh.13034.
- Storm DS, Boland MG, Gortmaker SL, He Y, Skurnick J, Howland L, Oleske, JM. Protease inhibitor combination therapy, severity of illness, and quality of life among children with perinatally acquired HIV-1 infection. Pediatrics. 2005;115(2): pages e173-e182. doi:10.1542/peds.2004-1693
- Weglarz M, Boland M. Family-centered nursing care of the perinatally infected mother and child living with HIV infection. Journal for specialists in pediatric nursing : JSPN. 2005;10(4): pages 161–170. doi:10.1111/j.1744-6155.2005.00037.x
- Boyd-Franklin, Nancy; Steiner, Gloria L.; Boland, Mary G., eds. (1995). Children, families, and HIV AIDS: psychosocial and therapeutic issues. New York: Guilford Press. ISBN 9780898625028.
- Report from the New Jersey Pediatric AIDS Advisory Committee, Mary Boland, R.N., M.S.N, Chairman, Generations in Jeopardy: Responding to HIV in Children, Women and Adolescents in New Jersey, UMDNJ AIDS Collection (Pediatric AIDS Advisory Committee, 1989).
