= Hereditary intestinal polyposis =

Hereditary intestinal polyposis may refer to:

- Peutz–Jeghers syndrome
- Familial adenomatous polyposis
