= The Littlest Victims =

1989 American TV film directed by Peter Levin

- Genre: Drama
- Screenplay by: J.J. Towne & Kenneth Cavander
- Story by: J.J. Towne
- Directed by: Peter Levin
- Starring: Tim Matheson
- Theme music composer: Joel Rosenbaum
- Country of origin: United States
- Original language: English

Production
- Executive producer: Marian Brayton
- Producers: Derek Kavanagh; Fern Field; Norman G. Brooks
- Production location: Atlanta, Georgia
- Cinematography: John McPherson
- Running time: 1hr. 40 min.
- Production company: CBS

Original release
- Network: CBS
- Release: April 23, 1989

The Littlest Victims is a 1989 CBS-produced biographical drama about Dr. James Oleske. The TV film was written by Kenneth Cavender and J.J. Towne based on a story by Towne and directed by Peter Levin. Dr. Oleske was the first U.S. physician to diagnose AIDS in children during the epidemic's early years when it was widely thought to be spread only though homosexual sex. It starred Tim Matheson as Oleske and was first broadcast on April 23, 1989.

== Storyline ==
In 1982, Oleske is practicing medicine at Newark, New Jersey's New Jersey Medical School when he discovers several of his pediatric patients failing to thrive and suffering from what appears to be suppressed immune systems. Most of his patients are impoverished inner city African Americans and Hispanics who are either intravenous drug users or the heterosexual partners thereof. His efforts to convince the Centers for Disease Control (CDC) that AIDS is the cause of this threat falls on largely deaf and hesitant ears, while another doctor asks him if Bible Belt politicians will enjoy having to tell their voters that their taxes are being spent on homosexuals and I.V. drug users living in the largely liberal coastal cities that are hated by many Bible Belters and where many AIDS cases were reported from.

Later, he receives a report from the CDC about infected transfusions and blood products and finds one of his pediatric patients had received blood from a donor who later developed and died of the disease, much to the anger of the patient's family over not being told this beforehand. TV reporters appear in the hospital wearing disposable latex gloves, surgical clothes and masks, afraid of becoming infected by being in the same room or building with Oleske and his AIDS patients.

Another of his patients, an adult female former prostitute and I.V. drug user, is informed by him that her child has the disease, indicating that its virus was passed to her child through her blood while she was pregnant, meaning that she became infected before she gave up drugs and prostitution. After her child dies of AIDS, she returns to her former lifestyle.

The publicity of Oleske's work on AIDS also causes problems with his family in his private life as his children are subjected to ridicule from their peers about this. In 1984, when it's announced that the virus that causes AIDS has been isolated, another one of his child patients dies of AIDS and is buried in a Gospel music style funeral that Oleske attends, and Oleske finally receives approval of his work from the CDC and promises to continue his work among his patients, even though they will eventually die young.
