= Bing Xia =

Chinese American scientist

Bing Xia is a Chinese American scientist and professor at the Rutgers Cancer Institute, where he directs the Xia Laboratory. He is best known for his discovery of the PALB2 tumor suppressor gene.

== Early life and education ==
Xia was born and raised in China and earned a B.S. degree in biochemistry from Wuhan University in 1992. He migrated to United States to pursue his graduate education at the University of Medicine and Dentistry of New Jersey (now Rutgers Health) in 1996. He completed his Ph.D. degree in biochemistry and molecular biology in 2001, and subsequently completed postdoctoral work at Dana-Farber Cancer Institute and Harvard Medical School. In 2007, Xia returned to New Jersey and started his independent laboratory at Rutgers Cancer Institute and has been there ever since. He was promoted to associate professor in 2013 and full professor in 2019.

== Career ==
Xia is a researcher focused on elucidating the molecular mechanisms and developmental path for PALB2/BRCA associated cancers with the goal of enhancing cancer treatment or prevention.

== Select publications ==
- Xia, Bing; Sheng, Qing; Nakanishi, Koji; Ohashi, Akihiro; Wu, Jianmin; Christ, Nicole; Liu, Xinggang; Jasin, Maria; Couch, Fergus J.; Livingston, David M. (June 23, 2006). "Control of BRCA2 cellular and clinical functions by a nuclear partner, PALB2". Molecular Cell. 22 (6): 719–729. doi:10.1016/j.molcel.2006.05.022. ISSN 1097-2765. PMID 16793542.
- Erkko, Hannele; Xia, Bing; Nikkilä, Jenni; Schleutker, Johanna; Syrjäkoski, Kirsi; Mannermaa, Arto; Kallioniemi, Anne; Pylkäs, Katri; Karppinen, Sanna-Maria; Rapakko, Katrin; Miron, Alexander; Sheng, Qing; Li, Guilan; Mattila, Henna; Bell, Daphne W. (March 15, 2007). "A recurrent mutation in PALB2 in Finnish cancer families". Nature. 446 (7133): 316–319. Bibcode:2007Natur.446..316E. doi:10.1038/nature05609. ISSN 1476-4687. PMID 17287723. S2CID 4340489.
- Rahman, Nazneen; Seal, Sheila; Thompson, Deborah; Kelly, Patrick; Renwick, Anthony; Elliott, Anna; Reid, Sarah; Spanova, Katarina; Barfoot, Rita; Chagtai, Tasnim; Jayatilake, Hiran; McGuffog, Lesley; Hanks, Sandra; Evans, D. Gareth; Eccles, Diana (February 2007). "PALB2, which encodes a BRCA2-interacting protein, is a breast cancer susceptibility gene". Nature Genetics. 39 (2): 165–167. doi:10.1038/ng1959. ISSN 1061-4036. PMC 2871593. PMID 17200668.
- Xia, Bing; Dorsman, Josephine C.; Ameziane, Najim; de Vries, Yne; Rooimans, Martin A.; Sheng, Qing; Pals, Gerard; Errami, Abdellatif; Gluckman, Eliane; Llera, Julian; Wang, Weidong; Livingston, David M.; Joenje, Hans; de Winter, Johan P. (February 2007). "Fanconi anemia is associated with a defect in the BRCA2 partner PALB2". Nature Genetics. 39 (2): 159–161. doi:10.1038/ng1942. ISSN 1061-4036. PMID 17200672. S2CID 36491877.
- Tischkowitz, Marc; Xia, Bing; Sabbaghian, Nelly; Reis-Filho, Jorge S.; Hamel, Nancy; Li, Guilan; van Beers, Erik H.; Li, Lili; Khalil, Tayma; Quenneville, Louise A.; Omeroglu, Atilla; Poll, Aletta; Lepage, Pierre; Wong, Nora; Nederlof, Petra M. (April 17, 2007). "Analysis of PALB2/FANCN-associated breast cancer families". Proceedings of the National Academy of Sciences of the United States of America. 104 (16): 6788–6793. Bibcode:2007PNAS..104.6788T. doi:10.1073/pnas.0701724104. ISSN 0027-8424. PMC 1871863. PMID 17420451.
