= Anita Gupta (physician) =

American anesthesiologist and pharmacologist

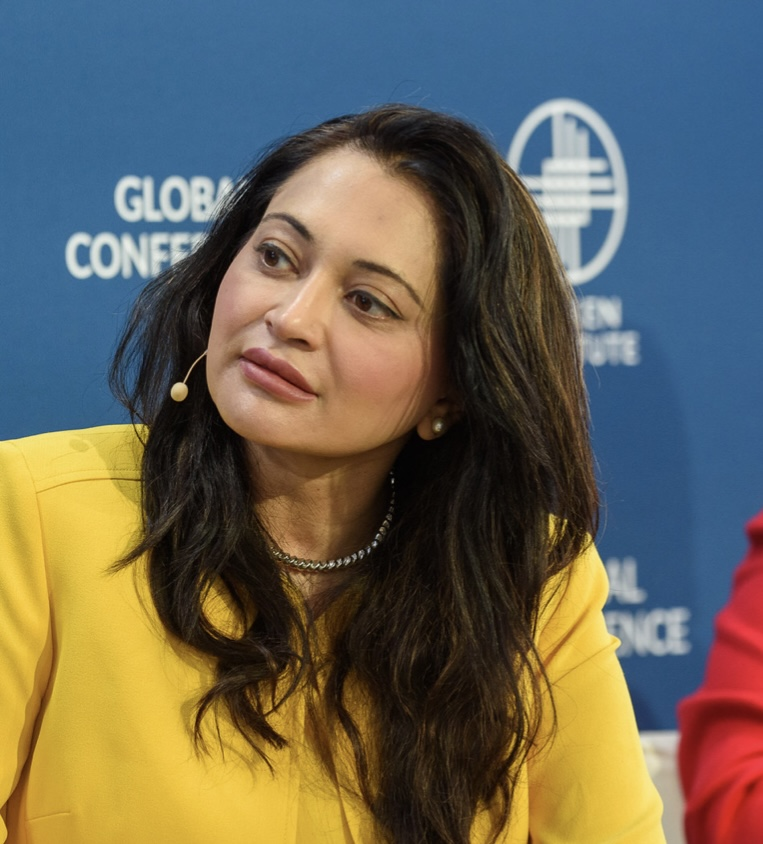
- Education: Rowan-Virtua School of Osteopathic Medicine (D.O.), Rutgers University (Pharm.D.), Princeton University (M.P.P.), Harvard Business School (GMP)
- Occupations: Anesthesiologist, pharmacologist, healthcare policy expert
- Employer(s): Johns Hopkins University, NYC Health
- Known for: Work on opioid crisis, pain, women's health, COVID-19 public health communication

Anita Gupta is an American anesthesiologist, pharmacologist, and healthcare policy expert. She is a faculty member at the Johns Hopkins School of Medicine and served as Chief Surgeon for NYC Health's management division. Gupta is widely recognized for her contributions to opioid policy, pain medicine, drugs, and public education during the COVID-19 pandemic.

== Early life and education ==
Gupta grew up in New Jersey and Philadelphia, where she was raised by a mother who worked in education and a father who practiced veterinary medicine. She began her undergraduate studies at The College of New Jersey before transferring to the Ernest Mario School of Pharmacy. There, she earned both a Bachelor of Science and a Doctor of Pharmacy (Pharm.D.) degree. She later joined Organon & Co., which eventually became part of Merck & Co., Inc., gaining early industry experience before pursuing a medical degree.

Gupta completed her medical training at Rowan University School of Osteopathic Medicine, earning her D.O. degree. She then underwent a residency in anesthesiology at the Georgetown University School of Medicine and completed a fellowship in interventional pain management at the Johns Hopkins School of Medicine.

In 2018, she earned a Master in Public Policy from Princeton University with a focus on health and healthcare policy. Two years later, she completed the General Management Program at Harvard Business School, where she served as class speaker and was named a program ambassador.

== Career ==
Gupta is a faculty member at Johns Hopkins University and previously served in clinical faculty and advisory roles at Drexel University and University of Pennsylvania. She has been a leading voice on issues related to pain management, opioid misuse, and drug policy. Gupta has advised federal agencies, including the Food and Drug Administration, on expanding access to naloxone and combatting the synthetic opioid crisis.

During the COVID-19 pandemic, Gupta was frequently cited as an expert on pain medicine, drugs, and public health. She appeared in major media outlets such as The New York Times, USA Today, and WebMD, advising against the preemptive use of ibuprofen before COVID-19 vaccination and discussing long-term immunity and public safety protocols.

She also contributed to public understanding of monoclonal antibody treatments and the flu-COVID coinfection risk.

Gupta is a frequent contributor to healthcare policy and drug discussions, writing for platforms such as Forbes and FierceHealthcare on topics including sustainability in healthcare, drug, digital health transformation, and data analytics. She has published extensively in academic journals and contributed to books on anesthesia pharmacology and drugs.

== Honors and recognition ==
Gupta has been recognized as one of the "Top Women of Influence" by FierceHealthcare and was named one of the "Emerging Pharma Leaders" by Pharmaceutical Executive. She has also been featured in the PharmaVoice 100 list. In 2022 she received the Patient Advocacy Award from the National Academies of Practices. In 2025, Gupta received the Arnold P. Gold Humanism in Medicine Award from the American Osteopathic College of Anesthesiologists.

Gupta is affiliated with global health and policy organizations including the Milken Institute and the World Economic Forum and the Gates Foundation.

== Selected works ==
- Gupta, A. (2013). "Pharmacology in Anesthesia Practice." European Journal of Anaesthesiology.
- Editor, Pharmacology in Anesthesia Practice, Oxford Academic, 2013.
- Editor, 50 Studies Every Anesthesiologist Should Know, Oxford Academic, 2018.
- Editor, Interventional Pain Medicine, Oxford Academic, 2012.
