= Granet =

Granet is a French surname. Notable people with the surname include:

- André Granet, French architect
- Bert Granet (1910–2002), American television producer
- Edward John Granet (1858–1918), British army officer
- François Marius Granet (1777–1849), French painter
- Guy Granet (1867–1943), British railway administrator
- Marcel Granet (1884–1940), French sociologist
- Roger Granet (born 1947), psychiatrist, psycho-oncologist, and author
