= Rutgers School of Health Professions =

Multi-campus college in New Jersey, US

- Type: Public
- Established: 1976
- Dean: Jeffrey DiGiovanni
- Students: 1,800
- Location: Newark, Piscataway, Stratford, and Scotch Plains, New Jersey, United States; 40.743447°N 74.191798°W
- Campus: Urban and Suburban
- Website: shp.rutgers.edu

The Rutgers School of Health Professions (abbreviated SHP, also known as Rutgers SHP) is one of the schools that form Rutgers Health, a division of Rutgers University. The school has campuses in Newark, Piscataway, Scotch Plains, and Stratford, New Jersey. SHP was formerly the School of Health Related Professions of the now-defunct University of Medicine and Dentistry of New Jersey (UMDNJ).

Established in 1973 as part of the University of Medicine and Dentistry of New Jersey, the school became part of Rutgers University in 2013 when UMDNJ was dissolved and largely merged into Rutgers Biomedical and Health Sciences. The word "Related" was dropped from the school's named in 2016.

Jeffrey DiGiovanni was named as the school's dean in June 2023.
