= Sonia Hernández-Díaz =

Spanish-American epidemiologist

- Born: Madrid, Spain
- Education: Universidad Autónoma de Madrid; Harvard School of Public Health
- Known for: Research on drug safety during pregnancy
- Awards: Fellow of the International Society for Pharmacoepidemiology
- Scientific career
- Fields: Epidemiology
- Institutions: Harvard T.H. Chan School of Public Health, Boston University School of Public Health

Sonia Hernández-Díaz is a Spanish-born American epidemiologist who is Professor of Epidemiology in the Harvard T.H. Chan School of Public Health. At the HUSPH, she is Director of the Pharmacoepidemiology program and assistant professor of epidemiology at the Boston University School of Public Health. Her research focuses on the evaluation of drug safety, especially during pregnancy. She has served as president of the International Society for Pharmacoepidemiology and the Society for Pediatric and Perinatal Epidemiologic Research, and is the chair of the Food and Drug Administration's Drug Safety and Risk Management Advisory Committee. During the COVID-19 pandemic, she began researching the effects of COVID-19 on pregnant women and their fetuses.

Hernández-Díaz is one of the creators of International Registry of Coronavirus Exposure in Pregnancy (IRCEP) which is a website for pregnant women who may have been exposed to COVID-19 and need a resource guide. I
