= Cecile Feldman =

American dental scientist

Cecile Arlene Feldman-Zohn
- Education: University of Pennsylvania (C'80 D'84 GD'85 WG'85)
- Scientific career
- Workplaces: Rutgers School of Dental Medicine (1988 - present)

Cecile Arlene Feldman-Zohn is an American dental scientist who is a professor and Dean of the School of Dental Medicine at the Rutgers University. Her research considers dental informatics and health services research. She was elected Fellow of the American Association for the Advancement of Science in 2020.

== Early life and education ==
Feldman was an undergraduate student at the University of Pennsylvania. During her second year, she decided she wanted to study dentistry and accelerated her course to complete in three years. She remained at the University for her dental degree, where she focused on patient care. She completed a Master of Business Administration in health care administration. As a dentistry student, she played piccolo in The University of Pennsylvania Band.

== Research and career ==
In 1988, Feldman joined the New Jersey Dental School (now Rutgers School of Dental Medicine). As of 2024, she was a Distinguished Professor in both that school and the Rutgers School of Public Health. Earlier in her career at Rutgers, she served as Director of Information Services and Quality Assurance, Associate Dean for Planning and Assessment, Acting Associate Dean for Academic Affairs, and Acting and Interim Dean.

Feldman works on dental informatics and the research of health services. In 2001, Feldman was made Dean of the Rutgers School of Medicine. She is on the Board of the Eastman Institute for Oral Health. She has campaigned to bring better dental care to veterans.

Feldman has researched how the combination of ibuprofen and acetaminophen can be used as an alternative to opioids. During the COVID-19 pandemic, Feldman started a clinical trial to understand the prevalence of COVID-19 amongst dental healthcare workers. She switched the region's dental practice to a fully telemedicine service, and shifted their training to a digital curriculum.

== Awards and honors ==
In 2010, Doctor Feldman and Doctor Harry Zohn jointly received the Award of Appreciation from the University of Pittsburgh School of Dental Medicine for their contributions to the mission and goals of the School of Dental Medicine.

In 2015, Doctor Feldman received the Shils Innovator Award for her outstanding leadership as an educator and her commitment to training tomorrow's dental care providers.

In 2024, the Penn Dental Medicine Alumni Society bestowed Doctor Feldman with the Thomas Evans Achievement Award, the organization's highest honor for alumni who have shown excellence, innovation, and leadership in the profession of oral health care.

== Selected publications ==
- C. A. Feldman; M. Giniger; M. Sanders; R. Saporito; H. K. Zohn; S. P. Perlman (1997). "Special Olympics, special smiles: assessing the feasibility of epidemiologic data collection". Journal of the American Dental Association. 128 (12): 1687–1696. doi:10.14219/jada.archive.1997.0131. PMID 9415766. Wikidata Q32162172.
- Jeanette E DeCastro; David Bolger; Cecile A Feldman (2005). "Clinical competence of graduates of community-based and traditional curricula". Journal of Dental Education. 69 (12): 1324–1331. PMID 16352768. Wikidata Q81623723.
