= Sex cord tumour with annular tubules =

- Other names: Sex cord tumor with annular tubules
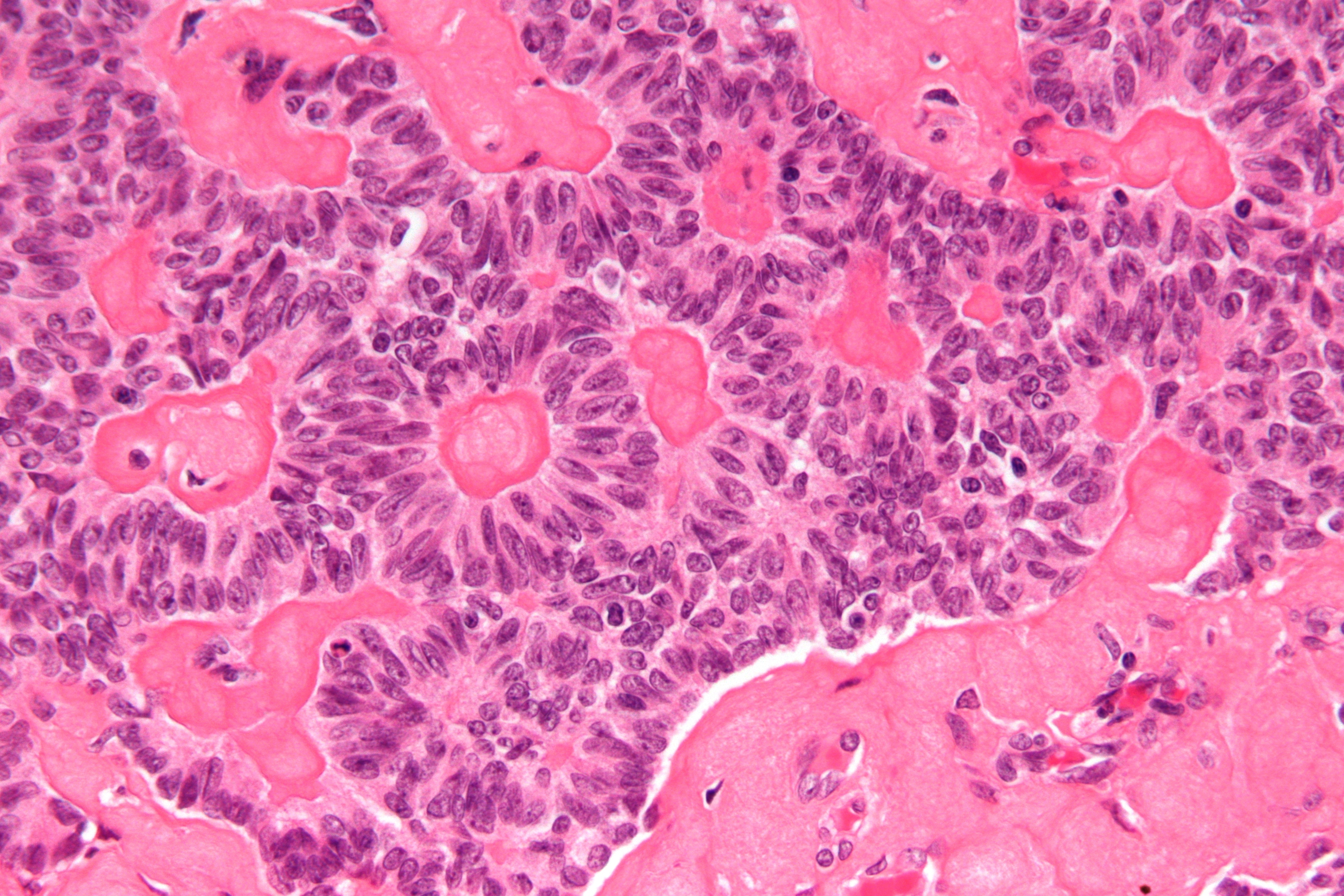
- Micrograph of a sex cord tumour with annular tubules. H&E stain.
- Specialty: Gynecology

Sex cord tumour with annular tubules (SCTAT) is a rare ovarian tumour in the sex cord group of gonadal tumours.

== Pathology ==
These tumours may be seen in the context of Peutz–Jeghers syndrome or be sporadic. Large tumours are more likely to be sporadic. Small incidental tumours are more likely to be syndromic.

It has a distinctive appearance under the microscope, from which it derives its name.

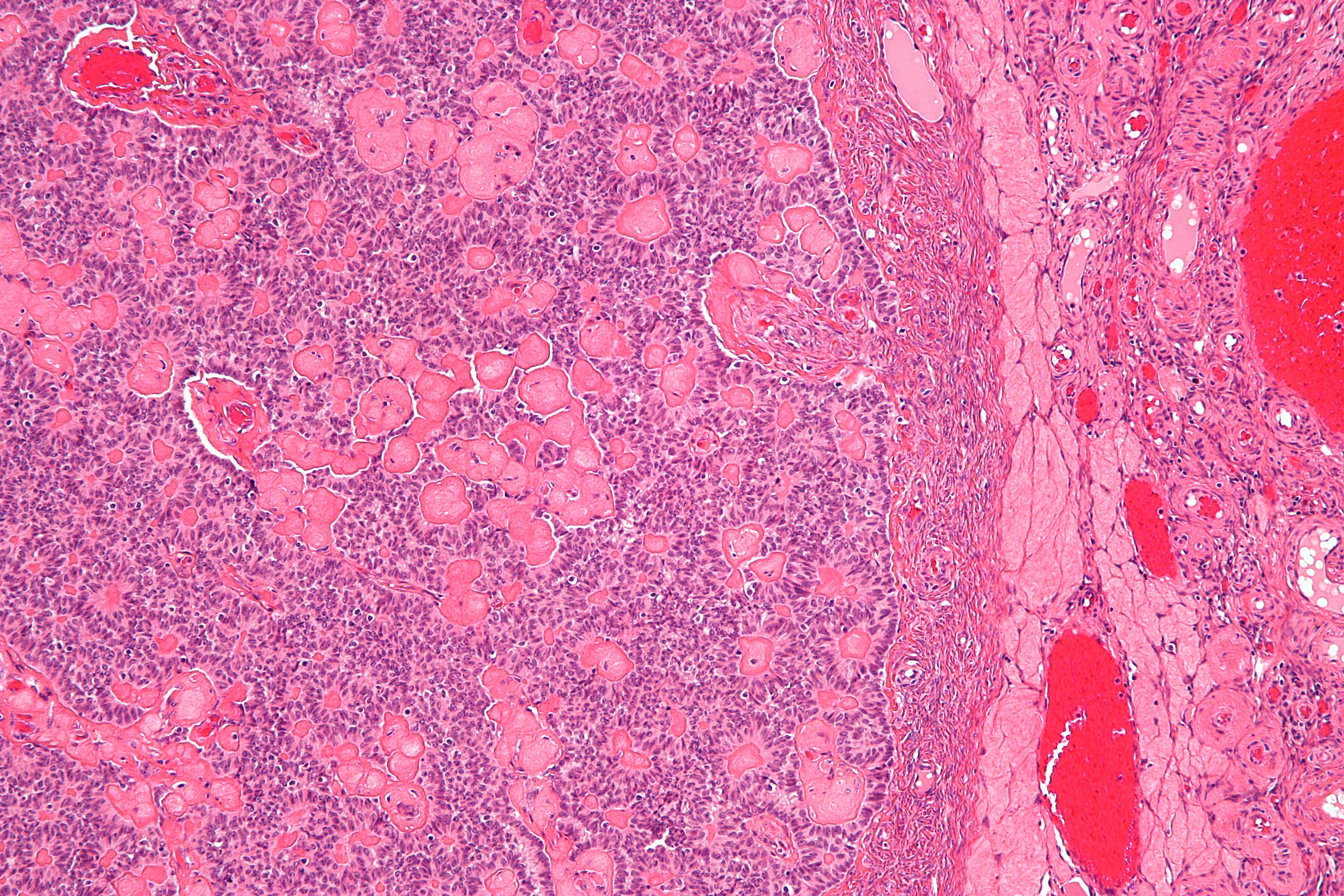
Intermediate magnification

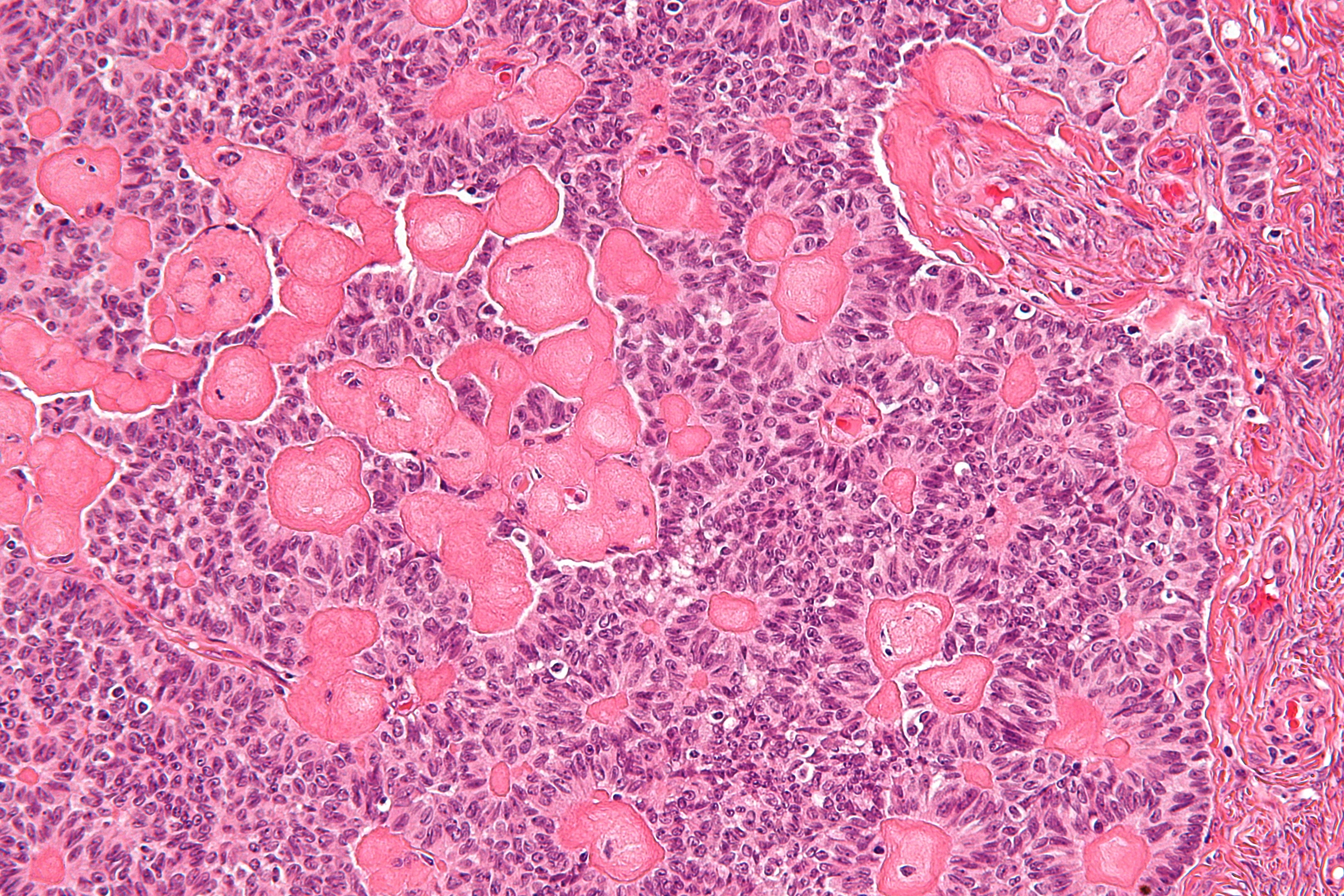
High magnification

== Prognosis ==
Generally, they are considered to be benign; however, occasional malignant cases are reported.

== See also ==
- Ovarian cancer
