= Ruy Lourenco =

Portuguese-American academic (1928–2021)

Dean of the New Jersey Medical School
- In office 1989–1999
- Preceded by: Vincent Lanzoni
- Succeeded by: Russell T. Joffe

Personal details
- Born: Ruy Valentim Lourenco; March 25, 1928 Lisbon, Portugal
- Died: August 15, 2021 (aged 93) Brazil
- Spouse(s): Dr. Susan Jane Loewenthal Lourenco (first wife); Dr. Tatiana Tscherbakowski Mourão Lourenço (second wife)
- Children: Peter Edward; Margaret Philippa
- Education: University of Lisbon (MD)
- Profession: Physician; Researcher; Academic administrator University professor

Ruy Valentim Lourenço (March 25, 1928 – August 15, 2021) was a Portuguese-American physician, medical educator, and academic leader whose career shaped multiple generations of clinicians and researchers. His contributions to medical education and research are reflected in the Ruy V. Lourenço Center for Emerging and Re-Emerging Pathogens at Rutgers University, which was named in recognition of his leadership and long-standing support for advancing scientific inquiry and institutional growth.

He served as Dean of the New Jersey Medical School from 1989 to 1999, where he expanded research capacity, strengthened clinical training programs, and guided the institution through a period of significant academic and institutional development. Before his deanship, he chaired the Department of Medicine at the University of Illinois College of Medicine from 1977 to 1989.

His scientific work focused on pulmonary physiology, including the control of breathing, tracheobronchial clearance, and aerosol deposition in the lung, and contributed to advances in clinical understanding of respiratory function and disease.

== Early life and education ==
Lourenco was born in Lisbon, Portugal, on March 25, 1928. He earned his Doctor of Medicine (MD) from the University of Lisbon.

== Career ==
Lourenco trained at Columbia University and joined the faculty at the New Jersey College of Medicine and Dentistry. In 1970, he became the founding Section Chief of the Section of Respiratory and Critical Care Medicine at the University of Illinois Chicago (UIC), a position he held until 1977. He then served as Chair of the Department of Medicine at UIC from 1977 to 1989.

In 1989, he became Dean of the New Jersey Medical School, serving until 1999. During his tenure, he advanced research and education in respiratory medicine and related biomedical fields.

== Legacy ==
The Ruy V. Lourenco Center for Emerging and Re-Emerging Pathogens at Rutgers University was established in 1999 and named in his honor. The Center supports collaborative research on infectious diseases, particularly those increasing in frequency or showing drug resistance. Its major research areas include drug-resistant Mycobacterium tuberculosis, bacterial-parasite coinfections, HIV biology, and antibacterial drug discovery. Researchers affiliated with the Center conduct both domestic and international studies, including in Uganda, India, Mexico, and Brazil. The Center is housed in a biosafety level-3 facility at Rutgers University and provides laboratory resources for researchers studying respiratory pathogens.

== Personal life ==
Lourenço was married twice. He had two children, Peter Edward and Margaret Philippa, with his first wife, Dr. Susan Jane Loewenthal Lourenço. He later married Dr. Tatiana Tscherbakowski Mourão Lourenço.

He died on August 15, 2021, in Brazil. He was survived by his grandchildren: Daniel Lourenco, Diana Szumiesz, Jax Blaska, and Maximillian Lourenco.

== Selected bibliography ==
- New Jersey Medicine: The Journal of the Medical Society of New Jersey. The Society. July 1989. p. 985.
