= Harold Jeghers =

American internist (1904–1990)

Harold Joseph Jeghers (September 26, 1904 – September 21, 1990) was an American internist, best known for his description of Peutz–Jeghers syndrome, a disorder of gastrointestinal polyps and hyperpigmentation of the mouth and lips.

== Life and scientific career ==
Jeghers was born in Jersey City, New Jersey, in 1904. In 1928, he graduated from Rensselaer Polytechnic Institute with a Bachelor of Science in Biology. He graduated from medical school at Western Reserve University in 1932. He worked as a consultant at Boston City Hospital before being appointed chairman of the Medicine Department at Georgetown University in 1946. In 1956, he become a professor at Seton Hall College. In 1966, he became a professor of Medicine at Tufts University School of Medicine. He retired in 1974.

He is best known for the description of Peutz–Jeghers syndrome in 1949, a syndrome of polyps in the gastrointestinal tract associated with hyperpigmentation of the lips and oral mucosa. The syndrome was previously described by Jan Peutz in 1921.
