= University of Medicine and Dentistry of New Jersey =

Dentistry school

- UMDNJ
- Former names: College of Medicine and Dentistry of New Jersey
- Type: Public
- Active: 1970–2013
- Location: Newark, Stratford, New Brunswick, Piscataway, Camden, and Scotch Plains, New Jersey, USA; 40°44′29″N 74°11′22″W
- Campus: 185 acres (0.75 km^{2}) Urban and suburban
- Website: Final version of www.umdnj.edu Redirection to Rutgers landing page

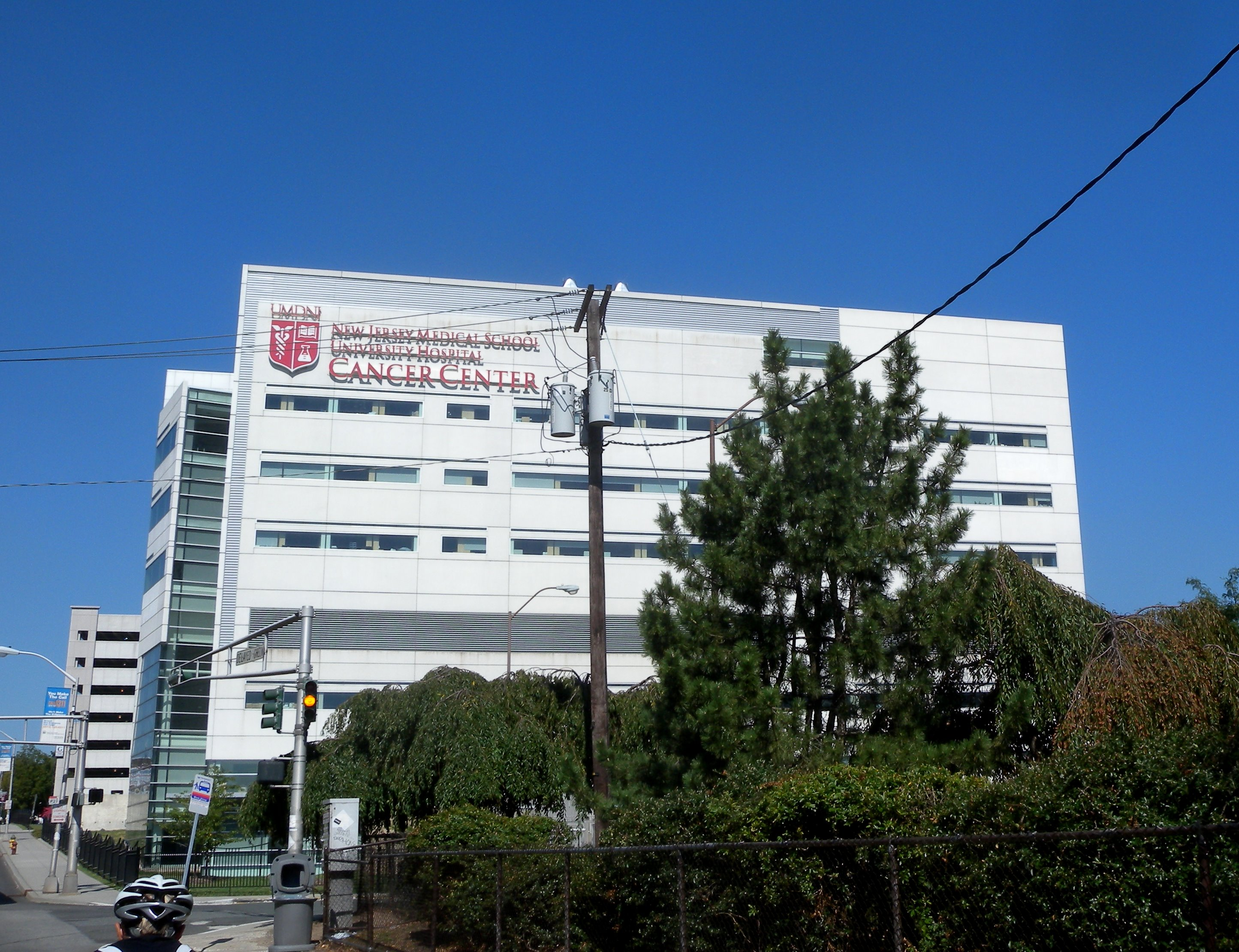
Cancer Center, Newark

The University of Medicine and Dentistry of New Jersey (UMDNJ) was a state-run health sciences institution with six locations in New Jersey.

It was founded as the Seton Hall College of Medicine and Dentistry in 1954, and by the 1980s was both a major school of health sciences, and a major research university. On July 1, 2013, it was dissolved, with most of its schools merging with Rutgers University to form a new Rutgers School of Biomedical and Health Sciences, while the School of Osteopathic Medicine, including its Graduate School of Biomedical Sciences, became part of Rowan University and was renamed the Rowan University School of Osteopathic Medicine.

== History ==
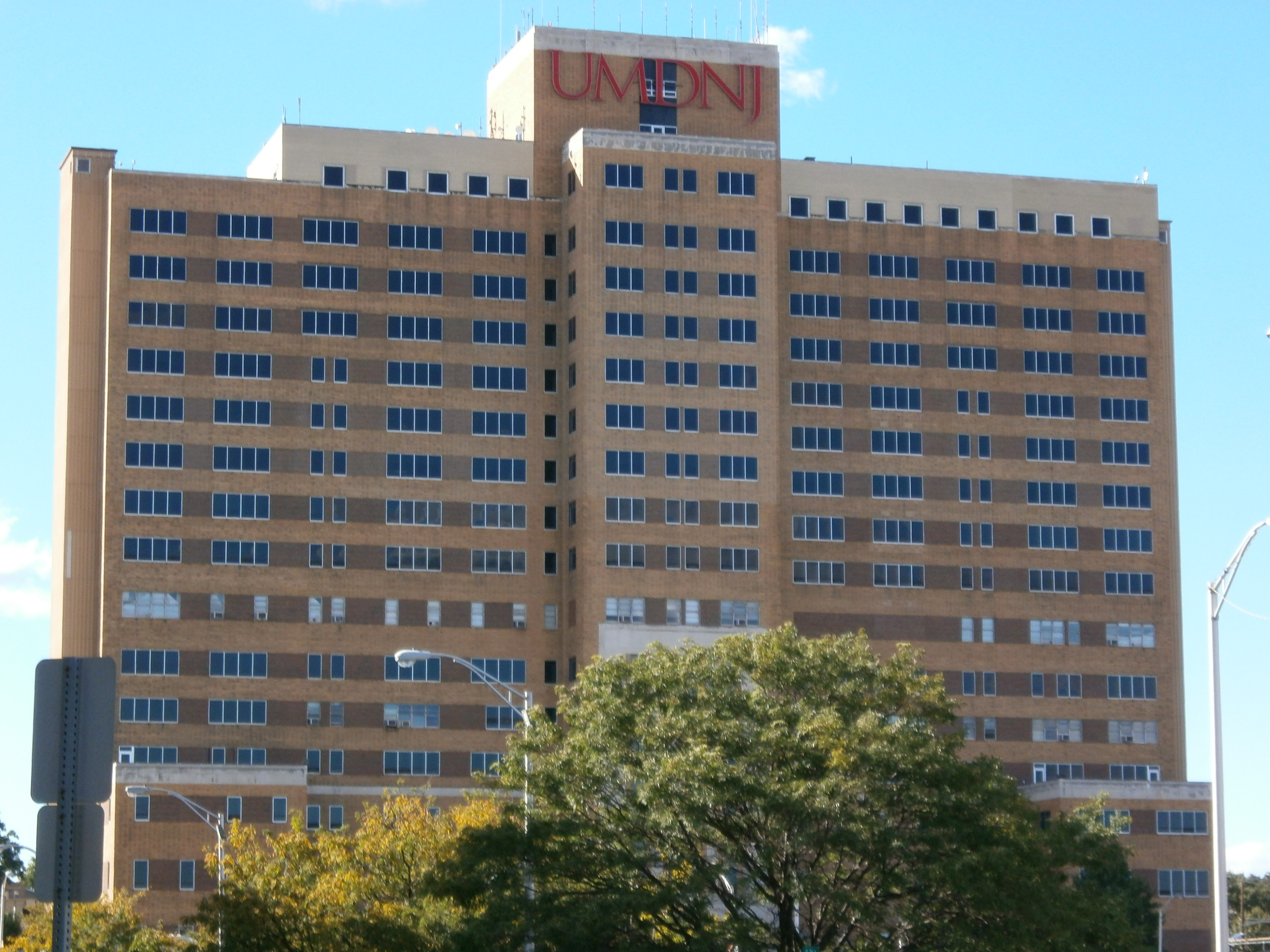
Former Martland Medical Center became part of UMDNJ

The university had two primary predecessor finding organizations:

- Seton Hall College of Medicine and Dentistry (1956), including two constituent colleges (medicine, dentistry)
- Rutgers Medical School (1966)

In 1965, the State of New Jersey took over Seton Hall's schools and merged them with the Rutgers school, forming the College of Medicine and Dentistry of New Jersey (CMDNJ).

In 1981, it was renamed to the University of Medicine and Dentistry of New Jersey (UMDNJ).

=== Seton Hall ===
The Seton Hall College of Medicine and Dentistry was incorporated on August 6, 1954. The college enrolled its first class in 1956 at the Jersey City Medical Center. This was the forerunner of the New Jersey Medical School, the New Jersey Dental School, and the Graduate School of Biomedical Sciences. In 1965, the college was acquired by the state of New Jersey and renamed the New Jersey College of Medicine and Dentistry (NJCMD).

=== Rutgers Medical School ===
Rutgers Medical School (RMS) opened in 1966 as a two-year basic science institution offering the master of medical science (M.M.S.) degree. In 1972, RMS added 2 years of clinical medical education to allow for a full 4-year medical curriculum. Raritan Valley Hospital in Green Brook Township, New Jersey, bought in 1970, was the primary clinical teaching hospital. By 1980, RMS had moved its clinical focus to New Brunswick, New Jersey, where clinical teaching programs had been established, primarily at Middlesex General Hospital and Saint Peter's Hospital and Raritan Valley Hospital was closed subsequently.

=== State takeover and merger ===
The College of Medicine and Dentistry of New Jersey (CMDNJ) was created by legislature in 1968 with the consolidation of the boards of trustees of Rutgers Medical School (now Robert Wood Johnson Medical School) and New Jersey College of Medicine and Dentistry. It was the largest school of health sciences of its kind in the United States. It was also the leading research university in New Jersey, edging the other major research universities in the state (including Princeton University and Rutgers University) in federal research grant dollars. It did, however, have various academic partnerships with universities and other institutions in New Jersey.

=== Relocation to Newark ===
In 1966 plans were made to move the school from Jersey City to Newark. Residents of the neighborhood targeted as the new location were blindsided by the decision. Community organizations banded together to oppose the relocation of the school, citing displacement of 20,000 people and businesses. President Johnson's Model City Act dictated community involvement. In 1968 Robert Wood, undersecretary of Housing and Urban Development, representatives from President Johnson's administration, and Governor Hughes urged Newark's Mayor Hugh Addonizio to negotiate in good faith with the community organizations as mandated by the Model City Act.

On March 15, 1968, a substantial agreement was made. One of the demands included was a smaller site than the 150 acres initially approved. In compromise the site was reduced to 57.9 acres, with another 63 acres was to be designated for housing and other related facilities to be developed and built by community organizations. Other compromises were the development of Community Health programs and an upgrade to the current Newark Community Hospital. The community secured jobs by mandating that 1/3 of the day laborers to build the hospital and college, and 1/3 of the workforce to run it were black and Latino. They also mandated the admittance of minority students into its program and the inaugural class had 28 minority students. This agreement became known as the Newark Accords. A binding agreement between the Community Organizations and the city, it also became the framework for other cities to follow in their negotiations. The University Hospital is a direct result of those agreements.

== Tuition raise ==
In July 2010, UMDNJ's board of trustees voted to raise tuition up to 21 percent for out-of-state students and up to 18% for in-state students. The changes occurred after medical students had already begun their clinical rotations, signed into housing agreements, and received their financial aid packages. Returning students received an additional bill after the academic year had already started. They had anticipated an increase of up to 4% based on historical data and their acceptance letters. However, Governor Chris Christie had passed a tuition cap of 4% for public universities on undergraduate tuition in 2010. In the students' eyes, the unprecedented increase in tuition was viewed as a way to make up a sudden financial deficit in UMDNJ's budget, though there was a lack of transparency by the UMDNJ Board of Trustees and President Denise Rodgers at the time.

== Dissolution ==
On 1 July 2013, UMDNJ was dissolved under legislation passed by the New Jersey state legislature on 28 June 2012 and signed by Chris Christie in August. University Hospital became an independent organization. Rowan University took over the School of Osteopathic Medicine. The other component schools were taken over by the Rutgers University system.

The School of Pharmacy was not part of the transfer, as it had been part of Rutgers University since 1927.

== List of presidents ==
- Stanley S. Bergen, Jr., 1971 – 1998 (including CMDNJ)
- Stuart D. Cook, 1999 – 2004
- John J. Petillo, 2004 – 2007 (interim)
- William F. Owen, 2007 – 2011
- Denise V. Rogers, 2012 - 2013 (interim)

== Academics ==
UMDNJ was made up of 8 schools:

- New Jersey Medical School – Newark
- New Jersey Dental School – Newark
- Graduate School of Biomedical Sciences – Newark, Piscataway, and Stratford
- School of Health Related Professions – Newark
- School of Nursing – Newark
- School of Public Health – New Brunswick
- Robert Wood Johnson Medical School – Piscataway
- School of Osteopathic Medicine – Stratford

UMDNJ also operated The University Hospital in Newark and the Raritan Valley Hospital in Greenbrook, New Jersey, while Robert Wood Johnson University Hospital in New Brunswick, Hackensack University Medical Center in Hackensack and Cooper University Hospital in Camden were affiliates of UMDNJ. UMDNJ also operated a palliative care facility for people living with AIDS.

UMDNJ had approximately 7,000 students in more than 100 degree and certificate programs; more than 13,000 employees, including nearly 2,500 faculty members; more than 31,000 alumni and more than 200 education and healthcare affiliates throughout New Jersey. The university was dedicated to pursuing excellence in the education of health professionals and scientists, conducting research, delivering healthcare, and serving the community. The National Science Foundation ranked UMDNJ #71 out of 630 universities and colleges in terms of R&D expenditures.

== Notable alumni and faculty ==
- Donald Arthur, Surgeon General of the U.S. Navy
- Oxiris Barbot, Commissioner of Health of the City of New York
- Stanley S. Bergen Jr., founding president of UMDNJ
- Philip J. Cohen, author of several books on the former Yugoslavia
- Anthony F. DePalma, orthopedic surgeon and professor, founded the university's orthopedic department and headed it for five years
- Roger Granet, psychiatrist, psycho-oncologist, and author and editor of several books on mental disorders and diseases.
- Harold Jeghers, NJMS Professor of Medicine and namesake of Peutz–Jeghers syndrome
- Bing Xia, scientist and professor at the Rutgers Cancer Institute of New Jersey, known for his discovery of the PALB2 tumor suppressor gene
- Marilyn Kozak, RWJMS Professor of Biochemistry, discoverer of the Kozak consensus sequence
- Howard Krein, surgeon
- Sandra Leiblum, RWJMS Professor of Clinical Psychiatry, first to describe Persistent Genital Arousal Disorder
- Paul J. Lioy, RWJMS Professor of Occupational and Community Medicine, author of DUST: The Inside Story of Its Role in the September 11th Aftermath (Rowman and Littlefield Publishers, Inc.)
- Sidney Pestka, RWJMS Professor of Microbiology, and Immunology, known as the "father of interferon" for his groundbreaking work developing antiviral treatments for hepatitis B and C
- Robert A. Schwartz, NJMS Chairman of Dermatology, co-discoverer of the Schwartz-Burgess Syndrome
- Arthur C. Upton, RWJMS Clinical Professor of Environmental and Community Medicine, former director of the National Cancer Institute
- Eric F. Wieschaus, Nobel Prize-winning biologist and RWJMS Adjunct Professor of Biochemistry
- René Joyeuse was an Allied OSS intelligence agent/officer during World War II, CMDNJ Assistant Professor of Surgery, co-founder of the American Trauma Society, involved in training physicians and EMS personnel in trauma care.

== Controversy and scandals ==
UMDNJ was involved in a series of Medicaid over-billings. The criminal complaint filed against the institution charged that health-care fraud occurred through alleged double-billing of Medicaid between May 2001 and November 2004 for physician services in outpatient clinics. A deferred prosecution agreement was filed in federal court in Newark, N.J., December 29, 2005 to avoid prosecution. Herbert Jay Stern, a former U.S. Attorney and federal judge in New Jersey, was appointed as a federal monitor to oversee and enforce compliance in accordance with the deferred prosecution agreement that outlines reform and action to help resolve illegal practices and restore financial integrity and professionalism to the institution. The monitor soon discovered dental students were being given credit for classes they did not attend. Local doctors were rewarded for no-show jobs at the school in exchange for sending patients to the cardiac-surgery center.

In March 2008, UMDNJ announced that its accreditation by the Middle States Commission on Higher Education had been restored, following the termination of the Deferred Prosecution Agreement; Stern had recommended the return of full responsibility for governance of the institution to UMDNJ's board of trustees after implementation of a number of systemic reforms by the Board and administration.

In Stratford, New Jersey, at the UMDNJ School of Osteopathic Medicine, Warren Wallace, the prior Senior Associate Dean for Academic and Student Affairs, was terminated amid accusations of unethical behavior. Accusations include inappropriate use of UMDNJ time and resources for political activities, efforts to obtain no-bid contracts for a friend or neighbor, and inappropriate actions in relation to obtaining admission to the School of Osteopathic Medicine for his daughter.

UMDNJ had placed New Jersey Senator Wayne Bryant on a "no-show" job to increase funding for the school, Bryant being the chairman of the Senate Budget and Appropriations Committee and the Legislature's Joint Budget Oversight Committee. Bryant stepped down from this position in February 2007. The case was investigated by former United States Attorney (later New Jersey governor) Christopher Christie. Bryant was found guilty of the charges on November 19, 2008, and received a four-year sentence in federal prison. R. Michael Gallagher, former dean of the School of Osteopathic Medicine, was convicted of bribing Bryant and received an 18-month sentence.

== See also ==
- Seton Hall University
- Montclair State University
- Rutgers University
- New Jersey Institute of Technology
- Kean University
- Rowan University
- Post-secondary education in New Jersey
- List of medical schools
- List of pharmacy schools
