= Virendra Nath Pandey =

Indian geneticist, molecular virologist and enzymologist

- Born: 8 October 1947 (age 78); Uttar Pradesh, India
- Education: Banaras Hindu University; Bhabha Atomic Research Center; University of Mumbai
- Known for: Studies on DNA recombinase enzyme complex
- Awards: 1991 Shanti Swarup Bhatnagar Prize
- Scientific career
- Fields: Molecular virologist; Enzymology
- Workplaces: Dr. Bhimrao Ambedkar University; Indian Drugs and Pharmaceuticals Limited; Bhabha Atomic Research Center; Awadh University; New Jersey Medical School

Virendra Nath Pandey (born 1947) is an Indian geneticist, molecular virologist and enzymologist, known for his studies on the DNA recombinase enzyme complex. He is an associate professor at the New Jersey Medical School of the Rutgers University and a former scientist at Bhabha Atomic Research Center. The Council of Scientific and Industrial Research, the apex agency of the Government of India for scientific research, awarded him the Shanti Swarup Bhatnagar Prize for Science and Technology, one of the highest Indian science awards, in 1991, for his contributions to biological sciences.

== Biography ==
Virendra Nath Pandey, after completing his graduate (Biology and Agricultural Sciences) and master's (Mycology and Plant Pathology) degrees in 1966 and 1968 respectively from Banaras Hindu University, started his career as a lecturer at Ranjit Singh Memorial PG College of Dr. Bhimrao Ambedkar University (formerly Agra University), where he worked until 1970. His next move was to Indian Drugs and Pharmaceuticals Limited, Rishikesh as a microbiologist and in 1973, he joined Bhabha Atomic Research Centre as an assistant professor, simultaneously pursuing his doctoral studies to secure his PhD from Mumbai University in 1985. He served BARC until 1996 when he moved to New Jersey Medical School of Rutgers University as an assistant professor where he is a emeritus professor at the department of microbiology, biochemistry and molecular genetics.

Pandey's researches are focused on genetic recombination and his studies on young rats revealed the presence of a DNA recombinase enzyme complex associated with their thymic nuclear matrix. He proposed that this presence in the prolymphocytes influences the rearrangement and recombination of genes in vertebrates. His researches are documented in a number of articles; ResearchGate, an online repository of scientific papers, has listed 91 of them. He has attended several international seminars, chaired many of them and has been an invited speaker at several others; Reverse Transcription Session of Retroviral Meeting of Cold Spring Harbor Laboratory (2003), International Conference on Drug Discovery of Central Drug Research Institute (2006), 36th Annual Meeting of Control Release Society, Copenhagen (2009) and Virology, Immunology and Epidemiology of Hepatitis Viruses - International Conference on Virology at Baltimore (2011) are some of the notable ones. He held the Biotechnology Associateship of the Department of Biotechnology in 1991 and the Council of Scientific and Industrial Research awarded him the Shanti Swarup Bhatnagar Prize, one of the highest Indian science awards the same year.

== See also ==
- Genetic recombination
