= Rutgers School of Public Health =

Graduate school in New Jersey

- Type: Public
- Established: 1983
- Dean: Perry N. Halkitis
- Location: Newark, Piscataway, and Stratford, New Jersey, United States; 40.743447°N 74.191798°W
- Campus: Urban and Suburban
- Website: sph.rutgers.edu

The Rutgers School of Public Health (SPH) is part of Rutgers Health. Prior to July 1, 2013, it was affiliated with the now-defunct University of Medicine and Dentistry of New Jersey. The School of Public Health educates students to become leaders in public health, researchers, and promoters of population and individual health.

As of the mid‑2020s, the School of Public Health enrolls over 600 students across its graduate and certificate programs and includes four academic departments: Biostatistics and Epidemiology, Environmental and Occupational Health and Justice, Health Behavior, Society and Policy, and Urban‑Global Public Health. The school is ranked among the top 25 schools and programs of public health in the United States by U.S. News & World Report.
