= Jane Aronson =

American physician

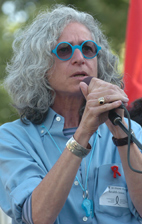
- Born: November 10, 1951 (age 74); Brooklyn, New York
- Education: UMDNJ – School of Osteopathic Medicine; Hunter College
- Occupation: Osteopathic physician
- Medical career
- Profession: Founder and CEO Worldwide Orphans Foundation
- Field: International Pediatric Health Services
- Institutions: Albert Einstein College of Medicine; Columbia Presbyterian; Winthrop-University Hospital; Weill College of Medicine of Cornell University

Jane Aronson, D.O. (born November 10, 1951, Brooklyn, New York) is an osteopathic physician, with expertise in pediatric infectious diseases and adoption medicine.

== Life and career ==
Jane Aronson grew up on Long Island, New York. After graduating from Hunter College in New York City, she was a school teacher for ten years. She became a physician after earning her Doctor of Osteopathic Medicine degree from the University of Medicine and Dentistry of New Jersey in 1986. She completed several residencies, including a pediatric residency and chief residency in New Jersey, and a fellowship in pediatric infectious diseases at Columbia Presbyterian/Babies Hospital in New York City. From 1992 to 2000, she was the Chief of Pediatric Infectious Diseases and Director of the International Adoption Medical Consultation Services in Mineola, New York.

In July 2000, Dr. Aronson went into private practice as Director of International Pediatric Health Services in New York City. She is Clinical Assistant Professor of Pediatrics at the Weill Medical College of Cornell University and has evaluated over 4,000 children adopted from abroad as an adoption medicine specialist. She has traveled to orphanages in Azerbaijan, Bulgaria, China, Ethiopia, Romania, Russia, Vietnam, and throughout Latin America.

== Worldwide Orphans Foundation ==
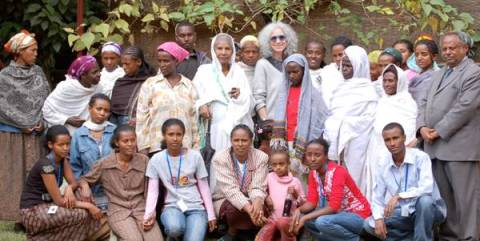
Jane Aronson at the WWO Academy in Ethiopia with family and community members.

In 1997, Aronson founded Worldwide Orphans Foundation (WWO). WWO's mission is to transform the lives of orphaned children and it accomplishes this through programs that address the medical and developmental conditions of children living in orphanages abroad. WWO was the first NGO to provide HIV+ orphans in Ethiopia and Vietnam with ARVs and has a medical mentoring program that ensures follow up treatment. WWO's major programs are in Bulgaria (Early Intervention Programs), Ethiopia (Family Health Clinic with AIDS Healthcare Foundation, the WWO Academy, an elementary school for orphans and community children, and summer camp), and in Vietnam (Early Intervention, Camp, and soon, integrated services as a USAID/NPI grantee).

=== WWO Ranger Program ===
WWO Ranger programs include the Orphan Rangers, which has been likened to a Peace Corps for orphanages, Global Arts Rangers, which brings in-country and US artists to provide workshops, teacher training, and integrated arts curricula, and Service Rangers, through which families and teens can work at an orphanage to complete a project identified by the orphanage itself. Since 1997, WWO Rangers have worked in Russia, Ukraine, Kazakhstan, Bulgaria, India, Ecuador, Vietnam, China, Serbia, Montenegro, and Ethiopia.

== Published work ==
=== Original, peer-reviewed articles ===
- Tottenham, N., Hare, T., Quinn, B., McCarry, T., Nurse, M., Gilhooly, T., Millner, A., Galvan, A., Davidson, M., Eigsti, I.M., Thomas, K.M., Freed, P., Booma, E.S., Gunnar, M., Altemus, M., & Aronson, J., Casey, B.J. Prolonged institutional rearing is associated with atypically larger amygdala volume and difficulties in emotion regulation. Developmental Science. 2008.
- Schulte J, Maloney S, Aronson J, San Gabriel P, Zhou J, Saiman L. Evaluating acceptability ad completeness of overseas immunization records of internationally adopted children. Pediatrics. 2002; 109 (2); pp e22.
- Saiman L, Aronson J, Zhou J, Gomez-Duarte C, San Gabriel P, Alonso M, Maloney S, Schulte J. Prevalence of infectious diseases among internationally adopted children. Pediatrics. 2001; 108 (3); 608–612.
- Aronson J. Medical evaluation and infectious considerations on arrival. Pediatr Ann. 2000; 218–222.
- Committee on Infectious Diseases. Planning for children whose parents are dying of HIV/AIDS. American Academy of Pediatrics. Committee on Pediatric AIDS, 1998–1999. Pediatrics. 1999; 103 (2): 509–511.
- Committee on Infectious Diseases and Committee on Pediatric AIDS. Measles immunization in HIV-infected children. AAP Policy. 1999; 103 (5): 1057.
- Committee on Pediatric AIDS and Infectious Diseases, American Academy of Pediatrics. Issues related to Human Immunodeficiency Virus transmission in schools, child care, medical setting, the home, and community. Pediatrics. 1999, 104(2): 318–324.
- Aronson J, McSherry G, Hoyt L, Boland M, Oleske J, Connor E, Persaud D, Borkowsky W, Krasinski K, Bakshi S, Pitt J, Gershon A. Varicella does not appear to be a cofactor for human immundefiency virus infection in children. Pediatric Infectious Disease Journal. 1992; 11: 1004–8

=== Case reports ===
- Eppinger MD, Aronson JE, Cunningham-Rundles C. Pneumocystis Carinii Pneumonia (PCP) in a 15 year old patient with chronic mucocutaneous candidiasis. Scand J Infect Dis. 1999;31(2): 203–6
- Sivakmaran M, Nachman SA, Spitzer E, Aronson J. Meningococcal meningitis revisited: normocellular CSF. Clinical Pediatrics. 1997; 36: 351

=== Review, chapters and editorials ===
- Red Book, Report of the Committee on Infectious Diseases, American Academy of Pediatrics. Collaborator. 2000, 2006.
- Alcohol-Related Disorders and Children Adopted from Abroad. Richard P. Barth, Madelyn Freundlich, and David Brodzinsky. Adoption & Prenatal Alcohol Drug Exposure: Research, Policy, and Practice. Evan B. Donaldson Adoption Institute and Child Welfare League Association, 2000.
- Alcohol-Related Birth Defects and International Adoption. International Adoption: Challenges and Opportunities. Parent Network for the Post-Institutionalized Child, 1999.
- Severe Sepsis in Infants and Children. Sepsis and Multiorgan Failure. Alan Fein, ed. Williams and Wilkins, 1997.

=== Abstracts ===
- Luo RF, Barlow M, Nguyen HT, Aronson JE. Growth and developmental delay of HIV-infected children in an orphanage in Vietnam. Pediatric Societies’ Annual Meeting, 2005.
- Roque Gordon R, Aronson JE. Evaluating immunizations in internationally adopted children. American Academy of Pediatrics 2003 National Conference and Exhibition.
- Johnson DE, Aronson JE, Federici R, Faber S, Tartaglia M, Daunauer L, Windsor M, Georgieff M. Profound, global growth failure afflicts residents of pediatric neuropsychiatric institutes in Romania. The American Pediatric Society and The Society for Pediatric Research, 1999. Abstract # 734.
- Aronson JE, Johnson DE, Melnikova M, Alonso M. Catch-up brain growth in children adopted from Eastern Europe and Russia. Pediatric Academic Societies Annual Meeting, May 1–4, 1999. Abstract # 1645.
- Johnson DE, Aronson JE, Cozzens D, Federici J, Federici R, Pearl P, Sbordone R, Storer D, Zeanah P, Zeanah C. Growth parameters help predict neurologic competence in profoundly deprived institutionalized children in Romania. Pediatric Academic Societies Annual Meeting, May 1–4, 1999. Abstract #1447.
- Aronson JE, Johnson DE, Hostetter MK, Traister M, Smith AM, Kothari V, Alonso M. Lead poisoning in children adopted from China. Pediatric Academic Societies Annual Meeting, May 1–4, 1999. Abstract #1381.
- Eppinger MD, Aronson JE, Cunningham-Rundles C. Pneumocystis Carinii Pneumonia (PCP) in a 15 year old patient with chronic mucocutaneous candidiasis. American College of Allergy, Asthma, and Immunology. November 8–11, 1996.
- Aronson JE, Who takes care of HIV-infected children on Long Island? Archives of Pediatrics and Adolescents Medicine. April 1995, p 109. Abstract #281.
- Aronson JE, Reindl FJ, Marino RV. Pediatricians think that general pediatricians should be responsible for the primary care of HIV-infected children. Supplement to Archives of Pediatrics & Adolescent Medicine. April 1995. Abstract 280, p 109.
- Aronson JE, A pediatric resident practice can assure the same immunization status as a faculty pediatric practice. American Journal of Disease in Children. April 1993. Vol 147, p 431. Abstract #65.
- Aronson JE, Sex Abuse in a Suburban Community in New Jersey. Pediatric Emergency Care. 1991, p 318.

== Honors and awards ==
- 2011 – Hunter College "Hall of Fame Alumni" Award
- 2009 – Glamour "Woman of the Year" Award
- 2007 – Azerbaijan Society of America Humanitarian Award
- 2006 – World of Children Humanitarian Award
