= Jan Peutz =

Dutch internist (1886–1957)

Johannes "Jan" Laurentius Augustinus Peutz (24 March 1886 – 20 December 1957) was a Dutch internist. In 1921, he published a case report on a form of polyposis and pigmentation which was later named Peutz–Jeghers syndrome.
