= Roger Granet =

American psychiatrist

Roger Granet (born 1947) is an American psychiatrist and the author and editor of over twenty books explaining mental disorders and diseases. Dr. Granet specializes in psycho-oncology, which deals with the psychological reactions of cancer patients. The field is considered an integral part of quality cancer treatment.

Dr. Granet is a consulting psychiatrist at Memorial Sloan-Kettering Cancer Center, where psycho-oncology was founded; Clinical Professor of Psychiatry at Weill Medical College of Cornell University, a lecturer of psychiatry at Columbia University College of Physicians and Surgeons; and an attending physician at New York-Presbyterian Hospital and Morristown Medical Center, where he established the Consultation Liaison Division.

He is a Distinguished Life Fellow of the American Psychiatric Association.

Dr. Granet wrote Surviving Cancer Emotionally: Learning How to Heal, Wiley (2001), arguing that "a patient's emotional well-being improves her quality of life,” while not connecting emotional states leads directly to the spread of cancer.

Dr. Granet is the editor of the Dell Mental Health Guide Series, a collection of books about specific emotional issues. He is the author of Is it Alzheimers? What To Do When Loved Ones Can't Remember What They Should, Dell (1998). He co-wrote If You Think You Have Depression, Dell (1998), with Robin Levinson. He and Robert Aquinas McNally adapted McNally’s Panic Disorder: A Critical Analysis (1994), a "comprehensive and lucid" and "well written" text, for a wider audience in If You Think You Have Panic Disorder, Dell (1998). He also co-authored Why Am I Up, Why Am I Down? Understanding Bipolar Disorder, Dell (1999), with Elizabeth Ferber.

He is a poet, with poems published in The New York Times and other periodicals. His two books of poetry are: Museum of Dreams, Thornwood Press (1997); and The World’s a Small Town, University of South Alabama Press (1993).

Granet’s undergraduate degree is from New York University, and his medical degree is from the Rutgers University of Medicine and Dentistry of New Jersey. He completed his internship and residency at New York-Presbyterian Weill Cornell Medical Center.
