= Rutgers School of Dental Medicine =

Dental school in Newark, New Jersey, US

Coordinates: 40.741388°N 74.190352°W

- Motto: Sol iustitiae et occidentem illustra
- Type: Public
- Established: 1956
- Dean: Cecile A. Feldman, D.M.D., M.B.A.
- Students: 375
- Location: Newark, New Jersey
- Campus: Urban
- Website: sdm.rutgers.edu
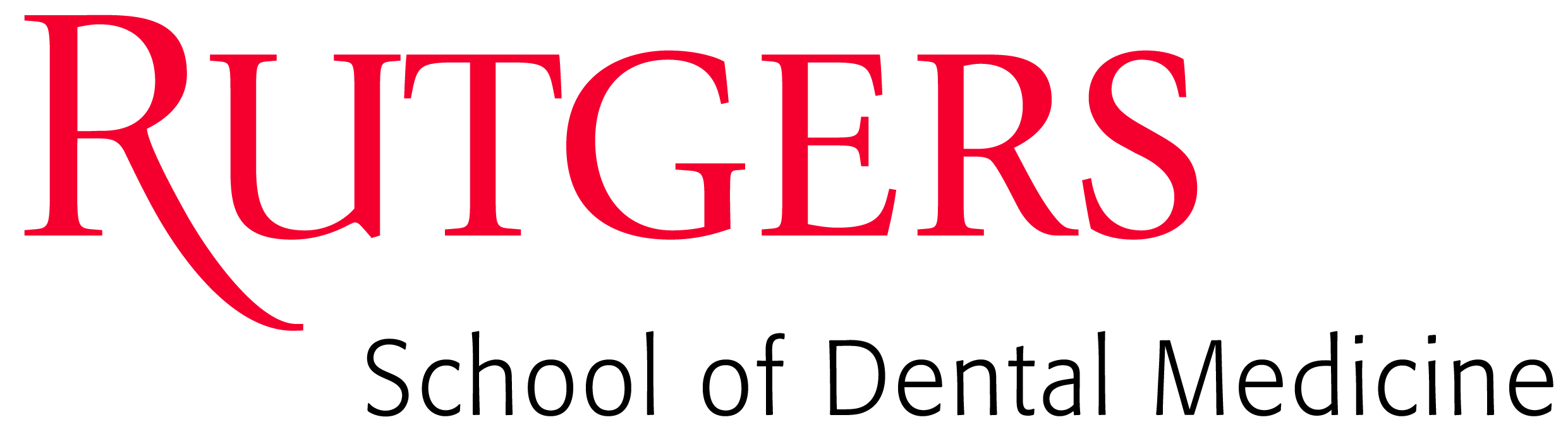

The Rutgers School of Dental Medicine (formerly New Jersey Dental School) is the dental school of Rutgers University. It is one of several professional schools that form Rutgers Health, a division of the university. Established in 1956, the dental school is located in the University Heights neighborhood in city of Newark, New Jersey, United States. It is the only dental school in New Jersey and is one of only two public dental schools in the New York metropolitan area.

On June 28, 2012 the New Jersey state legislature passed a bill that dissolved the University of Medicine and Dentistry of New Jersey and merged most of its schools, including New Jersey Dental School, with Rutgers University, forming Rutgers Biomedical and Health Sciences effective July 1, 2013.

== Admission ==
RSDM has a less than 5% acceptance rate. Most classes received over 2,200 applicants, with less than 95 seats available (~4.3%). In 2023, over 3,200 applications were received by the School of Dental Medicine. Applicants who gained admission to RSDM (class of 2027) had an average GPA of 3.6, and average sGPA of 3.7, and an average DAT score of 22. These statistics make it one of the most competitive dental schools in the United States.

== Background ==
Rutgers School of Dental Medicine graduated its first class of students over forty years ago. The school was established as part of the Seton Hall College of Medicine and Dentistry, admitting its first students in 1956. In 1965, the Seton Hall complex was acquired by the state. Three years later, the medical school moved into Newark, occupying temporary quarters near the Martland Medical Center. The dental school remained at the Jersey City location until the completion of its permanent facilities in Newark early in 1976.

The school awards the Doctor of Dental Medicine (D.M.D.) degree upon completion of a comprehensive four-year program. In addition, educational programs are offered in every field of dental study, from continuing education for practicing dentists to training in tooth brushing for school-age youngsters. Rutgers Dental has one of the most rigorous clinical programs of all DMD programs in the world, with ~90% acceptance rate into first choice GPR (General Practice Residency) programs and post-doctoral speciality programs.

== Facilities ==
In 2004, RSDM underwent major renovations with the additions of the 78,000-square-foot Oral Health Pavilion and the completion of renovations to the 194,000-square-foot Bergen Street Pavilion. The facility is on the Newark Campus. The Delta Dental Educational Conference Center on the main level consists of a Multipurpose Room and three lecture halls with seating for 400 and audiovisual equipment. Members of student organizations hold meetings and events there, and the dental school host celebrations there, including the annual White Coat ceremony and Match Day reception. When the Conference Center is not being used by the dental school, the community can use it for civic, cultural and educational events. On the upper level, faculty and students provide treatment in patient clinics that are outfitted with dental equipment and technology. During the annual Cancer Screening and Health Fair, faculty members perform oral examinations in the clinics, and students from across the country converge there to participate in the Gateway to Dentistry and Summer Medical and Dental Education programs.

== Education ==
Rutgers School of Dental Medicine offers the following academic programs:

D.M.D. Program
A four-year program leading to the Doctor of Dental Medicine degree.

Internationally trained dentists D.M.D. Program
A two-year program leading to the Doctor of Dental Medicine degree for international dentists.

Graduate Dental Education
• General Practice Residency
• Master's degree in oral biology

Specialty Graduate Dental Education
• endodontics
• periodontics
• oral surgery, four-year and six-year programs
• orthodontics
• pedodontics (pediatric dentistry)
• prosthodontics

== See also ==
- American Student Dental Association
