= International Society for Pharmacoepidemiology =

The International Society for Pharmacoepidemiology (ISPE) is a society focused on the practice of pharmacoepidemiology.

== History ==
The society was officially launched by Stanley A. Edlavitch, David E. Lilienfeld, and Hugh A. Tilson in 1989 during the Fifth International Conference on Pharmacoepidemiology (ICPE) in Minneapolis.

ISPE is the only international acting society dealing with the topics of pharmacoepidemiology in the context of pharmacovigilance or drug safety; the International Society for Pharmacoeconomics and Outcomes Research (ISPOR) addresses outcomes research epidemiology.

The society has organized yearly conferences since its foundation.

The society's office is located in Bethesda, Maryland, and its executive secretary is James Vrac. A number of the major figures in drug safety and pharmacovigilance have served as its presidents, and its officers and trustees have been drawn from the leadership of the pharmacoepidemiology community.

Members of the Society come from 53 nations and mostly come from academia, pharmaceutical industry, contract research organizations and governmental institutions (e.g., U.S. Food and Drug Administration, National Institutes of Health, EMA, BfArM, Robert Koch Institute (RKI)) acting as drug regulators.

The official journal of the society is Pharmacoepidemiology and Drug Safety, which is indexed in MEDLINE. The regularly edited newsletter Scribe is available on ISPE's website. The original Society newsletter was the PharmacoEpidemiology Newsletter (PEN), created by Stanley A. Edlavitch (edited by Edlavitch and David E. Lilienfeld) in 1985. In 1992, the Society returned the PEN to Edlavitch.

The current president of the society is Daniela Claudia Moga, MD, PhD, from the College of Pharmacy, University of Kentucky.

The upcoming ICPE meeting is planned for Aug 21 to 27, 2027 at the Washington State Convention Center in Seattle, Washington.

The ISPE is directed by a structured board of trustees, ensuring that each of its various constituencies has a voice within the organization. The major areas within which pharmacoepidemiology is practiced (industry, government, academia) provide the framework for the three forums within which ISPE members may raise items for discussion by the ISPE Board.

== Society presidents ==
- 2028: Susan dosReis, BSPharm, PhD, FISPE (School of Pharmacy, University of Maryland, Baltimore, USA)
- 2027: Daniela Claudia Moga, MD, PhD, FISPE (College of Pharmacy, University of Kentucky, USA)
- 2026: Ursula Kirchmayer, MPH, FISPE (Department of Epidemiology, Lazio Regional Health Service, Italy)
- 2025: Mary Beth Ritchey, MSPH, PhD, FISPE (Center of Pharmacoepidemiology and Treatment Sciences, Rutgers University, USA)
- 2024: Lisa Pont, PhD, MSc, BPharm, FISPE (Graduate School of Health, University of Technology Sydney, Sydney, Australia)
- 2023: Tobias Gerhard, PhD, BPharm, FISPE (Center of Pharmacoepidemiology and Treatment Sciences, Rutgers University, USA)
- 2022: Vincent Lo Re III, MD, MSCE, FISPE (Center for Real-World Effectiveness and Safety of Therapeutics, Penn Medicine, USA)
- 2021: Olaf Klungel, PharmD, PhD, FISPE (Division of Pharmacoepidemiology & Clinical Pharmacology, Utrecht University, Netherlands)
- 2020: Almut Winterstein, RPh, PhD, FISPE (Department of Pharmaceutical Outcomes and Policy, College of Pharmacy, University of Florida)
- 2019: Alison Bourke, BSc, MSc, FRPharmS, FISPE (Center for Advanced Evidence Generation, IQVIA, London, UK)
- 2018: Jesper Hallas, MS, FISPE (Department of Public Health, University of Southern Denmark, Denmark)
- 2017: Kiyoshi Kubota, MD, PhD, FISPE (NPO Drug Safety Research Unit Japan)
- 2016: Sonia Hernández-Díaz, MD, DrPH, FISPE (Harvard T.H. Chan School of Public Health, USA)
- 2015: John D. Seeger, PharmD, DrPH, FISPE (Division of Pharmacoepidemiology and Pharmacoeconomics, Brigham & Women's Hospital, USA)
- 2014: Til Stürmer, MD, MPH, PhD, FISPE (UNC Gillings School of Global Public Health, USA)

== See also ==
- Pharmacoepidemiology and Drug Safety
