= Rowan-Virtua School of Osteopathic Medicine =

Osteopathic medical school of Rowan University

- Former names: University of Medicine and Dentistry of New Jersey - SOM; Rowan University School of Osteopathic Medicine
- Type: Public
- Established: 1976
- Parent institution: Rowan University
- Budget: $123.05 million
- Dean: Richard T. Jermyn, DO
- Faculty: 211 (full time)
- Students: 745
- Location: Stratford, New Jersey, U.S. 39.830834°N 75.006586°W
- Campus: Suburban
- Website: www.rowan.edu/som

The Rowan-Virtua School of Osteopathic Medicine (also known as Rowan-Virtua SOM) is a public medical school located in Stratford, New Jersey. Founded in 1976, Rowan-Virtua SOM is the osteopathic program within Virtua Health College of Medical and Life Sciences of Rowan University. It is one of the two medical schools of Rowan University, alongside the Cooper Medical School. Rowan-Virtua SOM confers the Doctor of Osteopathic Medicine degree (DO), and was ranked by the U.S. News & World Report in 2016 as one of the top medical schools for geriatric care and primary care.

Rowan-Virtua SOM is accredited by the American Osteopathic Association's Commission on Osteopathic College Accreditation.

== History ==
The school was established under the University of Medicine and Dentistry of New Jersey in 1976 by the New Jersey state legislature. Initial classes were held at what is now Robert Wood Johnson Medical School for its first two years until its campus was complete. The first class of 24 students began on September 7, 1977.

Rowan-Virtua SOM's first affiliate was Kennedy University Hospital, which remains as a core teaching hospital. The Kennedy Health System included hospitals in Stratford (adjacent to the SOM campus), Cherry Hill, and Washington Township. Its current primary affiliate is Virtua Health, which includes its primary teaching hospitals, such as Virtua Voorhees, Virtua Our Lady of Lourdes Hospital in Camden, Lourdes Medical Center in Willingboro, Christ Hospital in Jersey City, and Inspira Medical Centers in Elmer and Vineland.

The SOM Specialty Care Center opened in 1987; two years later, the adjoining Primary Care Center was purchased. The Science Center was built the following year and began functioning as the primary campus for the 4-year medical program. The campus was completed in 1993 with the addition of the new Academic Center.

On June 28, 2012, the New Jersey state legislature passed the New Jersey Medical and Health Sciences Education Restructuring Act, which dissolved the University of Medicine and Dentistry of New Jersey on July 1, 2013. This resulted in the merger of the Stratford SOM campus with Rowan University; the remainder of its teaching schools became associated with Rutgers University. University Hospital became an independent entity.

The school is accredited by the American Osteopathic Association's Commission on Osteopathic College Accreditation (COCA) and by the Commission on Higher Education of the Middle States Association of Colleges and Schools.

== Academics ==
The school has a close affiliation with the 600–bed Jefferson Health Stratford hospital (through their acquisition of Kennedy Health System in 2017) and Virtua Our Lady of Lourdes Hospital, a 437-bed tertiary hospital in Camden, New Jersey.

== Notable alumni ==
- Jane Aronson (born 1951), physician, with expertise in pediatric infectious diseases and adoption medicine.
