= Rutgers Health =

Organization under Rutgers University

- Type: Public
- Established: 2013
- Chancellor: Brian L. Strom
- Location: Newark, New Brunswick, Piscataway, and Camden, New Jersey, United States
- Campus: Urban and Suburban
- Website: https://rutgershealth.org/

Rutgers Health is the umbrella group for Rutgers University's medical schools, medical research and clinical healthcare units.

It was established in 2013 as Rutgers Biomedical and Health Sciences after parts of the University of Medicine and Dentistry of New Jersey were merged into Rutgers. It was renamed Rutgers Health in 2023. While its various facilities are spread across several locations statewide, Rutgers Health is considered the university's fourth campus.

== Schools ==
Rutgers Health contains seven schools:

- New Jersey Medical School
- Robert Wood Johnson Medical School
- Ernest Mario School of Pharmacy
- Rutgers School of Dental Medicine
- Rutgers School of Nursing
- Rutgers School of Health Professions
- Rutgers School of Public Health

In addition, the Rutgers Graduate School of Biomedical Sciences offers graduate work in research to the PhD level. Other research institutions include the Cancer Institute of New Jersey, the Center for Advanced Biotechnology and Medicine, and the Institute for Health, Health Care Policy and Aging Research among others.

== Rutgers Health ==
In 2016, the Rutgers University Board of Governors approved the establishment of Rutgers Health as a new health care provider organization and the clinical arm of the university. Rutgers Health works in coordination with Rutgers Health Group, a nonprofit subsidiary that serves as an integrated, interprofessional faculty practice plan with more than 1,000 Rutgers-based clinicians. It also collaborates with Rutgers Health Network, a consortium of teaching hospitals, community centers, medical groups, wellness centers, and other affiliated partners that provide care through their relationship with Rutgers.
