= Rutgers Graduate School of Biomedical Sciences =

School in Newark and Piscataway, New Jersey, US

Coordinates: 39.830834°N 75.006586°W

- Type: Public
- Established: 1956
- Dean: Jeffery DiGiovanni
- Location: Newark and Piscataway, New Jersey, United States
- Campus: Urban and Suburban
- Website: http://gsbs.rutgers.edu

The Graduate School of Biomedical Sciences (GSBS; formerly UMDNJ-GSBS) was one of the schools of the University of Medicine and Dentistry of New Jersey (UMDNJ).

Following the enactment of the New Jersey Medical and Health Sciences Education Restructuring Act and the dissolution of UMDNJ on July 1, 2013, the GSBS programs at Newark and Piscataway became part of the newly established Rutgers Graduate School of Biomedical Sciences, while the Stratford-based programs became part of the Rowan University Graduate School of Biomedical Sciences.

The school offered graduate education and research training in the biomedical sciences at campuses in Newark, Piscataway, and Stratford, New Jersey.

== History ==
The Graduate School of Biomedical Sciences (GSBS) was established in 1956 and became one of the eight schools of the University of Medicine and Dentistry of New Jersey (UMDNJ). The school offered graduate education and research training in the biomedical sciences at campuses in Newark, Piscataway, and Stratford.

As part of the reorganization of New Jersey's public higher education system, UMDNJ was dissolved on July 1, 2013. The GSBS programs at Newark and Piscataway were transferred to Rutgers University and became the Rutgers Graduate School of Biomedical Sciences, while the Stratford programs became part of the Rowan University Graduate School of Biomedical Sciences.

In 2017, the Rutgers Graduate School of Biomedical Sciences was merged with the Graduate School-New Brunswick to form the Rutgers School of Graduate Studies, consolidating graduate education programs across the university.
