= Pharmacoepidemiology =

Science studying the uses and effects of drugs in populations

Pharmacoepidemiology is the study of the uses and effects of drugs in well-defined populations.

To accomplish this study, pharmacoepidemiology borrows from both pharmacology and epidemiology. Thus, pharmacoepidemiology is the bridge between both pharmacology and epidemiology. Pharmacology is the study of the effect of drugs and clinical pharmacology is the study of effect of drugs on clinical humans. Part of the task of clinical pharmacology is to provide a risk benefit assessment by effects of drugs in patients:

- doing the studies needed to provide an estimate of the probability of beneficial effects on populations,
- or assessing the probability of adverse effects on populations.

Other parameters relating to drug use may benefit epidemiological methodology. Pharmacoepidemiology then can also be defined as the transparent application of epidemiological methods through pharmacological treatment of conditions to better understand the conditions to be treated.

Epidemiology is the study of the distribution and determinants of diseases and other health states in populations. Epidemiological studies can be divided into two main types:

1. Descriptive epidemiology describes disease and/or exposure and may consist of calculating rates, e.g., incidence and prevalence. Such descriptive studies do not at this time use health control groups and can only generate hypotheses, but not test them. Studies of drug use would generally fall under descriptive studies.
2. Analytic epidemiology includes two types of studies: observational studies, such as case-control and cohort studies, and experimental studies which include clinical trials or randomized clinical trials. The analytic studies compare an exposed group with a control group and usually designed as hypothesis testing by studies.

Pharmacoepidemiology benefits from the methodology developed in general epidemiology and may further develop them for applications of methodology unique to needs of pharmacoepidemiology. There are also some areas that are altogether unique to pharmacoepidemiology, e.g., pharmacovigilance. Pharmacovigilance is a type of continual monitoring of unwanted effects and other safety-related aspects of drugs that are already placed in current growing integrating markets. In practice, pharmacovigilance refers almost exclusively to spontaneous reporting systems which allow health care professionals and others to report adverse drug reactions to the central agency. The central agency combines reports from many sources to produce a more informative profile for drug products than could be done based on reports from fewer health care professionals.

In Australia, a 10% sample of all people eligible for government-subsidised medicines by the Pharmaceutical Benefits Scheme (PBS) are made available for research purposes. Licences are held between Services Australia, who hold the data for the PBS, and academics at Monash University, University of New South Wales, University of South Australia and the University of Western Australia to use the 10% sample for research purposes. Research outputs from these data have to be approved by Services Australia prior to publication. These data create a useful picture of all dispensed medicines in Australia and allow for pharmacovigilance and to explore trends in medicines usage.

== See also ==
- Epidemiology
- Exposome
- International Society for Pharmacoepidemiology
- Molecular epidemiology
- Molecular pathological epidemiology
- Pharmacovigilance
