= Rutgers School of Nursing =

Public college in Newark, New Jersey, US

Coordinates: 40.49445°N 74.44846°W

- Type: Public
- Established: 2014
- Dean: Angela Starkweather
- Location: Newark, New Brunswick, and Blackwood, New Jersey, U.S.
- Website: nursing.rutgers.edu

Rutgers School of Nursing is the nursing school at Rutgers University, with headquarters in Newark and additional campuses at New Brunswick, and Blackwood, New Jersey.

Rutgers University School of Nursing was established on July 1, 2014, with the unification of Rutgers College of Nursing and School of Nursing at University of Medicine and Dentistry of New Jersey; it was renamed Rutgers School of Nursing.

== History ==
=== Rutgers College of Nursing ===
Rutgers College of Nursing was involved in the education of nurses since the early 1940s when the Newark and Camden campuses offered courses in public health nursing. The nursing program at the Newark campus, located in Ackerson Hall, was established in 1952 with funds allocated by Governor Alfred E. Driscoll of New Jersey. In 1955, the School of Nursing (as it was referred to at the time) received accreditation by the National League for Nursing. on March 6, 1956, the School of Nursing became the College of Nursing. Ella V. Stonsby, first director of the School of Nursing, was appointed the first dean of the college.

In 1955, a master's level program in psychiatric nursing was established with support from a grant from the National Institute of Mental Health. In 1974 a master's programs in community health nursing, parent/child nursing, and medical/surgical nursing were added. in 1989 a doctor of philosophy program in nursing was approved by the New Jersey Board of Higher Education.

== Nursing student activities ==
- Rutgers Student Nurses’ Association, Chapter of the NJ Nursing Students, Inc. and NJ State Nurses Association
- Rutgers Graduate Student Association
- Alpha Tau chapter of Sigma, International Honor Society of Nursing
- Graduate Nursing Student Academy at the American Association of Colleges of Nursing
- American Association for Men in Nursing
- National Association of Hispanic Nurses, New Jersey Chapter
- Philippine Nurses Association of New Jersey
- Northern New Jersey Black Nurses Association
- New Jersey Integrated Black Nurses Association
- Chi Eta Phi sorority
