= Peutz–Jeghers syndrome =

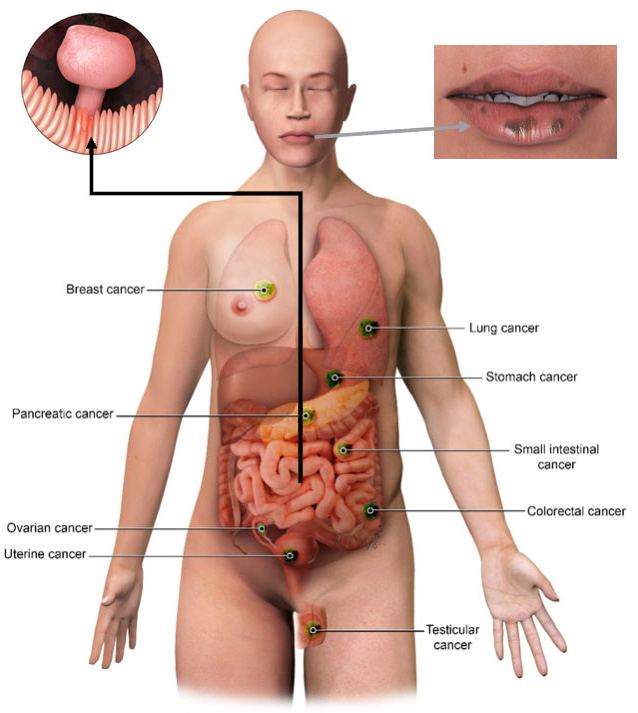
- Manifestations of Peutz–Jeghers syndrome
- Specialty: Medical genetics
- Frequency: 0.0005%
- Named after: Jan Peutz; Harold Jeghers

Peutz–Jeghers syndrome (often abbreviated PJS) is an autosomal dominant genetic disorder characterized by the development of benign hamartomatous polyps in the gastrointestinal tract and hyperpigmented macules on the lips and oral mucosa (melanosis). This syndrome can be classed as one of various hereditary intestinal polyposis syndromes and one of various hamartomatous polyposis syndromes. It has an incidence of approximately 1 in 25,000 to 300,000 births.

== Signs and symptoms ==
The risks associated with this syndrome include a substantial risk of cancer, especially of the breast and gastrointestinal tracts. Colorectal cancer is the most common malignancy, with a lifetime risk of 39 percent, followed by breast cancer in females with a lifetime risk of 32 to 54 percent.

Patients with the syndrome also have an increased risk of developing carcinomas of the liver, lungs, breast, ovaries, uterus, testes, and other organs. Specifically, it is associated with an increased risk of sex-cord stromal tumor with annular tubules in the ovaries.

Due to the increased risk of malignancies, direct surveillance is recommended.

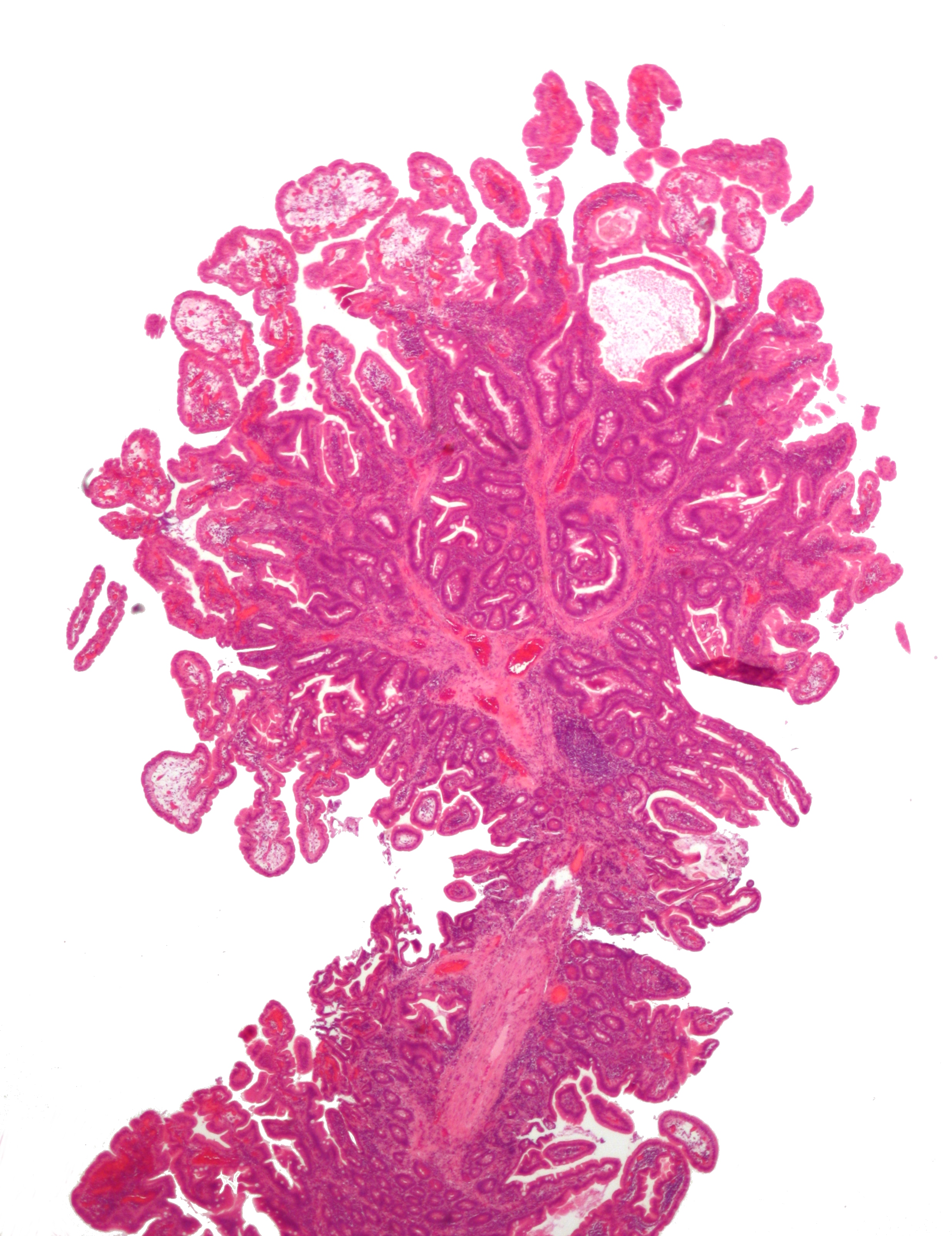
Micrograph of Peutz–Jeghers type colonic polyp. H&E stain.

The average age of first diagnosis is 23. The first presentation is often bowel obstruction or intussusception from the hamartomatous gastrointestinal polyps. Dark blue, brown, and black pigmented mucocutaneous macules, are present in over 95 percent of individuals with Peutz–Jeghers syndrome. Pigmented lesions are rarely present at birth, but often appear before 5 years of age. The macules may fade during puberty. The melanocytic macules are not associated with malignant transformation.

Complications associated with Peutz–Jeghers syndrome include obstruction and intussusception, which occur in up to 69 percent of patients, typically first between the ages of 6 and 18, though surveillance for them is controversial. Anemia is also common due to gastrointestinal bleeding from the polyps.

== Genetics ==
In 1998, a gene was found to be associated with the mutation. On chromosome 19, the gene known as STK11 (LKB1) is a possible tumor suppressor gene. It is inherited in an autosomal dominant pattern, which means that anyone who has PJS has a 50% chance of passing the disease on to their offspring.

Peutz–Jeghers syndrome is rare and studies typically include only a small number of patients. Even in those few studies that do contain a large number of patients, the quality of the evidence is limited due to pooling patients from many centers, selection bias (only patients with health problems coming from treatment are included), and historical bias (the patients reported are from a time before advances in the diagnosis and treatment of Peutz–Jeghers syndrome were made). Probably due to this limited evidence base, cancer risk estimates for Peutz–Jeghers syndrome vary from study to study. There is an estimated 18–21% risk of ovarian cancer, 9% risk of endometrial cancer, and 10% risk of cervical cancer, specifically adenoma malignum.

== Diagnosis ==
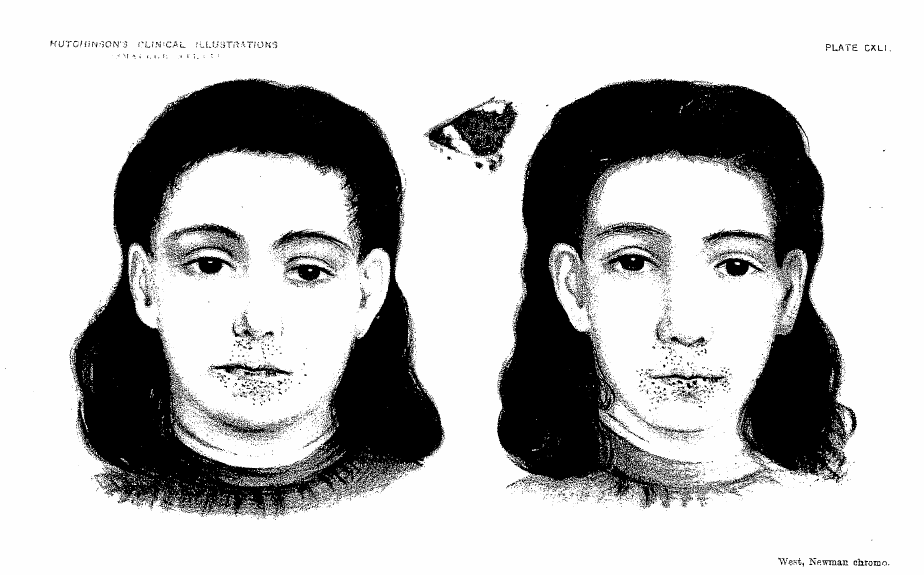
Drawing from 1896 publication of twins thought to have Peutz–Jeghers Syndrome

The main criteria for clinical diagnosis are:

- Family history
- Mucocutaneous lesions causing patches of hyperpigmentation in the mouth and on the hands and feet. The oral pigmentations are the first on the body to appear, and thus play an important part in early diagnosis. Intraorally, they are most frequently seen on the gingiva, hard palate and inside of the cheek. The mucosa of the lower lip is almost invariably involved as well.
- Hamartomatous polyps in the gastrointestinal tract. These are benign polyps with a low potential for malignancy.

Having two of the three listed clinical criteria indicates a positive diagnosis. The oral findings are consistent with other conditions, such as Addison's disease and McCune–Albright syndrome, and these should be included in the differential diagnosis. 90–100% of patients with a clinical diagnosis of PJS have a mutation in the STK11/LKB1 gene. Molecular genetic testing for this mutation is available clinically.

== Management ==
The American Cancer Society advises that everyone with Peutz-Jeghers syndrome undergoes routine yearly physical exams with blood counts, and to begin gastrointestinal cancer screening no later than age 10. Regular surveillance of polyps helps prevent complications including bleeding and intussusception.

== Prognosis ==
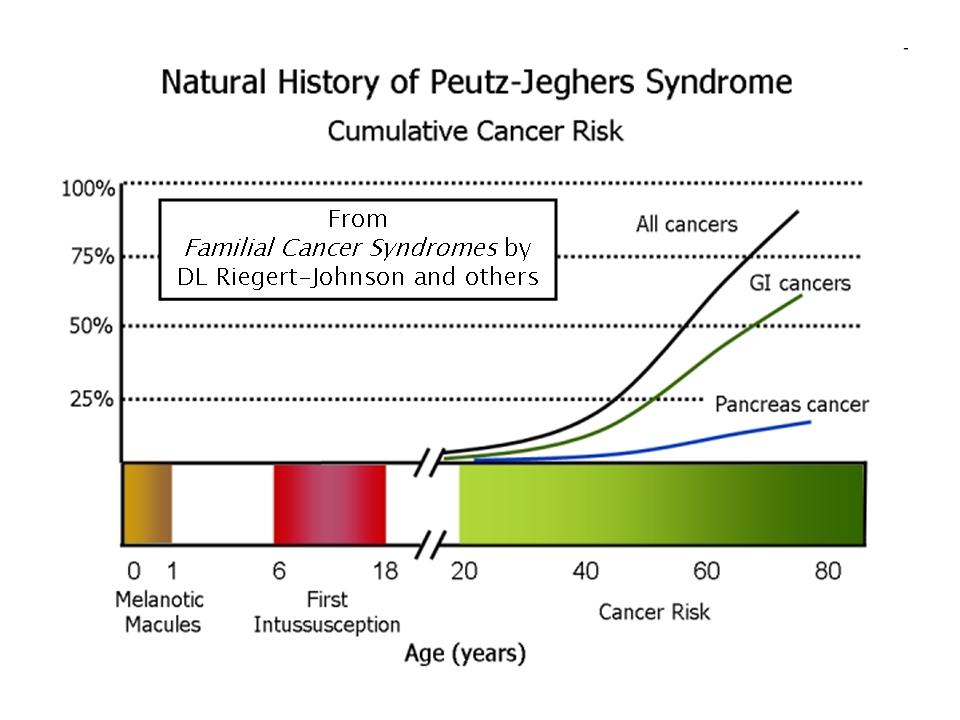
Most people with Peutz–Jeghers syndrome will have developed some form of neoplastic disease by age 60.

Most patients will develop flat, brownish spots (melanotic macules) on the skin, especially on the lips and oral mucosa, during the first year of life, and a patient's first bowel obstruction due to intussusception usually occurs between the ages of six and 18 years. The cumulative lifetime cancer risk begins to rise in middle age. Cumulative risks by age 70 for all cancers, gastrointestinal (GI) cancers, and pancreatic cancer are 85%, 57%, and 11%, respectively.

A 2011 Dutch study followed 133 patients for 14 years. The cumulative risk for cancer was 40% and 76% at ages 40 and 70, respectively. 42 (32%) of the patients died during the study, of which 28 (67%) were cancer related. They died at a median age of 45. Mortality was increased compared with the general population.

A family with sinonasal polyposis were followed up for 28 years. Two cases of sinonasal type adenocarcinoma developed. This is a rare cancer. This report suggested that follow up of sinus polyps in this syndrome may be indicated.

=== Monitoring ===
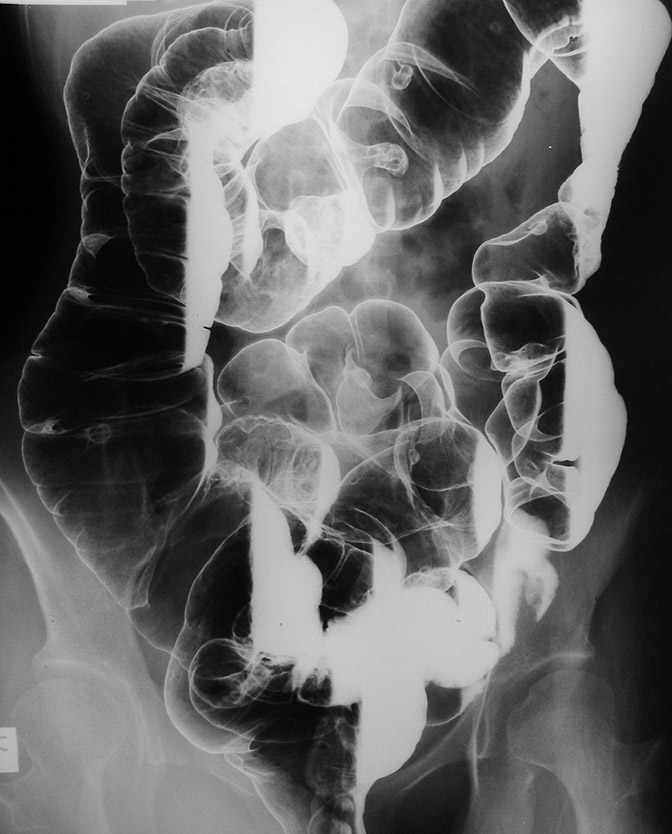
Barium enema radiograph showing multiple polyps (mostly pedunculated) and at least one large mass at the hepatic flexure coated with contrast in a patient with Peutz–Jeghers syndrome

Some suggestions for surveillance for cancer include the following:

- Small intestine with small bowel radiography every two years,
- Esophagogastroduodenoscopy and colonoscopy every two years,
- CT scan or MRI of the pancreas yearly,
- Ultrasound of the pelvis and testes yearly
- Mammography from age 30 annually
- Papanicolaou smear (Pap smear) annually beginning at age 18–20

Follow-up care should be supervised by a physician familiar with Peutz–Jeghers syndrome. Genetic consultation and counseling as well as urological and gynecological consultations are often needed.

== Eponym ==
First described in a published case report in 1921 by Jan Peutz (1886–1957), a Dutch Internist, it was later formalized into the syndrome by American physicians at Boston City Hospital, Harold Joseph Jeghers (1904–1990) and Kermit Harry Katz (1914–2003), and Victor Almon McKusick (1921–2008) in 1949 and published in the New England Journal of Medicine.

== See also ==
- List of cutaneous conditions
- Sex cord tumour with annular tubules
