= New Jersey Medical School =

Rutgers University public medical school

Coordinates: 40.74014°N 74.18922°W

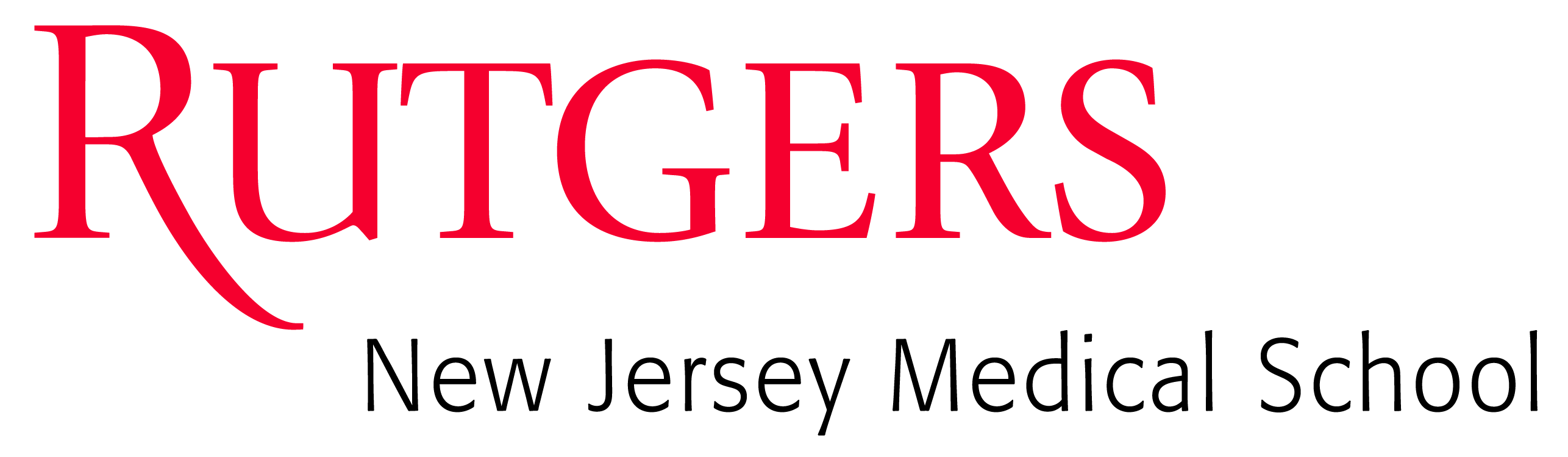
- Motto: Sol iustitiae et occidentem illustra
- Type: Public medical school
- Established: 1954
- Parent institution: Rutgers University
- Dean: Robert L. Johnson
- Academic staff: 700 full-time and part-time 1,300 volunteer
- Students: 680
- Location: Newark, New Jersey, United States
- Campus: Urban
- Website: http://njms.rutgers.edu

New Jersey Medical School (NJMS) is the medical school of Rutgers University, a public university in Newark, New Jersey. It has been part of the Rutgers Health since the 2013 dissolution of the University of Medicine and Dentistry of New Jersey. Founded in 1954, NJMS is the oldest school of medicine in New Jersey.

== History ==
The school of medicine was founded in 1954 as the Seton Hall College of Medicine and Dentistry, established under the auspices of the Roman Catholic Archdiocese of Newark, in Jersey City, New Jersey. On August 6, 1954, the college was incorporated as a legal entity separate from Seton Hall University, but with an interlocking Board of Trustees. The first class of 80 students was admitted to the four-year MD program in September 1956, becoming only the sixth medical school in the New York City metropolitan area. In 1965, the institution was acquired by the State of New Jersey, renamed the New Jersey College of Medicine and Dentistry (NJCMD), and relocated to Newark, New Jersey. With the passing of the Medical and Dental Education Act of 1970, signed into law by Governor William T. Cahill on June 16, the College of Medicine and Dentistry of New Jersey (CMDNJ) was created, merging NJCMD with the two-year medical school established at Rutgers University in 1961, under a single board of trustees. With the creation of the CMDNJ, the medical school adopted its title the New Jersey Medical School. In 1981, legislation signed on December 10 by Governor Byrne established CMDNJ as the University of Medicine and Dentistry of New Jersey (UMDNJ). NJMS served as one of five regional campuses that constitute the UMDNJ health science institution.

On June 28, 2012, the New Jersey state legislature passed a bill that dissolved the University of Medicine and Dentistry of New Jersey and merged most of its schools including New Jersey Medical School with Rutgers University forming a new Rutgers Division of Biomedical and Health Sciences effective July 1, 2013.

== Teaching hospitals ==
New Jersey Medical School's core teaching hospital, The University Hospital, is located on campus. It is home to a Level I Trauma Center, the busiest in the state, and one of the nation's most active liver transplant programs. The 504-bed facility is also highly regarded for its Comprehensive Stroke Center, the New Jersey Cardiovascular Institute (NJCI), the cochlear Implant Program, a neurosurgical intensive care unit and a special Brain Tumor Program, the Neurological Institute of New Jersey, a federally designated spinal cord injury program and The University Center for Bloodless Surgery and Medicine. University Hospital is also the state's single largest provider of charity care. Approximately 500 residents are pursuing advanced clinical training at University Hospital in 18 accredited programs.

Other major affiliated teaching sites include Hackensack University Medical Center, Morristown Medical Center, and the East Orange Veterans Affairs Hospital. And more recently the addition of Trinitas Regional Center for the internal medicine program.

== Notable alumni and faculty ==
- Virendra Nath Pandey, Associate professor, Shanti Swarup Bhatnagar laureate
- Ruy Lourenco, Dean 1989-99
- Robert A. Schwartz, Chairman of Dermatology, co-discoverer of the Schwartz-Burgess Syndrome
- John V. Azzariti, M.D. 1992, New Jersey State Assemblyman (New Jersey General Assembly 2024-present)
