= List of Rutgers University people =

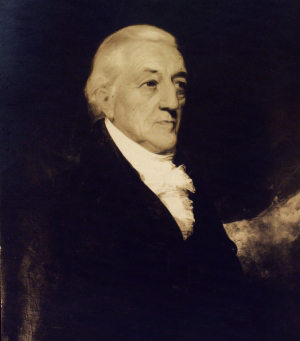
An 1825 donation from Revolutionary War hero and philanthropist Colonel Henry Rutgers (1745–1830) reopened the school after many years of financial problems. The Trustees renamed Queen's College to Rutgers College to honor his generosity.

This is an enumeration of notable people affiliated with Rutgers University, including graduates of the undergraduate and graduate and professional programs at all three campuses, former students who did not graduate or receive their degree, presidents of the university, current and former professors, as well as members of the board of trustees and board of governors, and coaches affiliated with the university's athletic program. Also included are characters in works of fiction (books, films, television shows, et cetera) who have been mentioned or were depicted as having an affiliation with Rutgers, either as a student, alumnus, or member of the faculty.

Some noted alumni and faculty may be also listed in the main Rutgers University article or in some of the affiliated articles. Individuals are sorted by category and alphabetized within each category. Default campus for listings is the New Brunswick campus, the system's largest campus, with Camden and Newark campus affiliations and their antecedent institutions noted.

== Presidents of Rutgers University ==
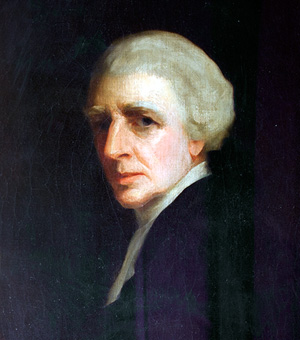
The Rev. Jacob Rutsen Hardenbergh was the driving force behind establishing the college. Hardenbergh traveled to England in 1763 to lobby King George III on the proposal and, in 1766, obtained a charter from New Jersey's provisional governor, William Franklin.

Since 1785, twenty-two men have served as the institution's president, beginning with Jacob Rutsen Hardenbergh (1735–1790), a Dutch Reformed clergyman who was responsible for establishing the college. Before 1930, most of the university's presidents (eight of the twelve) were clergymen affiliated with Christian denominations in the Reformed tradition (either Dutch Reformed, Presbyterian, or German Reformed). Presidents Hasbrouck (1840–1850), Frelinghuysen (1850–1862), Gates (1882–1890), and Scott (1891–1906) were all laymen. Two presidents were alumni of Rutgers College: William H. S. Demarest (Class of 1883) and Philip Milledoler Brett (Class of 1892). The current president is William F. Tate IV. He succeeded Jonathan Holloway. Holloway, a U.S. historian, was the first person of color to lead Rutgers University.

The president serves in an ex officio capacity as a presiding officer within the university's 59-member board of trustees and its eleven-member board of governors, and is appointed by these boards to oversee day-to-day operations of the university across its three campuses. He is charged with implementing board policies with the help and advice of senior administrators and other members of the university community. The president is responsible only to those two governing boards—there is no oversight by state officials. Frequently, the president also occupies a professorship in his academic discipline and engages in instructing students.

== Nobel laureates ==
- Milton Friedman, 1912–2006, A.B. 1932, economist, public intellectual, winner of the Nobel Prize in Economics (1976)
- Toni Morrison (honorary doctorate), taught at Rutgers, novelist (Beloved, Song of Solomon), Nobel Prize in Literature (1993), Pulitzer Prize for Fiction (1988)
- Selman Waksman 1918–1958, Bachelor's in Agriculture, professor of microbiology; discovered 22 antibiotics (including streptomycin); winner of the Nobel Prize in Physiology or Medicine (1952)

== Notable trustees and benefactors ==
- Andrew Kirkpatrick (1756–1831), lawyer, chief justice of New Jersey Supreme Court, trustee 1782–1809
- Littleton Kirkpatrick (1797–1859), attorney and politician, trustee 1841–1859
- Henry Rutgers (1745–1830), military officer and philanthropist after whom Rutgers is named

== Notable alumni ==
=== Architecture ===
- Louis Ayres, Medievalist architect best known for designing the United States Memorial Chapel at the Meuse-Argonne American Cemetery and Memorial and the Herbert C. Hoover U.S. Department of Commerce Building
- Frank Townsend Lent

=== Arts and entertainment ===
==== Art ====
- Brad Ascalon, Class of 1999, industrial designer
- Alice Aycock, Class of 1968, sculptor
- Marc Ecko, fashion designer
- Gia Giudice, social media and reality television star, daughter of Teresa Giudice
- Roy Lichtenstein, artist
- Lore Kadden Lindenfeld, textile designer
- Kojiro Matsukata, art collector whose collection helped form the National Museum of Western Art in Tokyo
- Amira Rasool, entrepreneur and fashion journalist
- George Segal, GSNB 1963, sculptor
- Cassie Yeung, chef, dancer, and TikTok star

==== Entertainment ====
- DJ Akademiks, real name Livingston Allen, hip hop YouTuber and journalist
- Joanna Angel, adult film actress
- Roger Bart, actor (Desperate Housewives, The Producers; Tony Award for You're a Good Man, Charlie Brown)
- Mario Batali, Class of 1982, chef, restaurateur, television host (Molto Mario, Iron Chef America)
- Bill Bellamy, Class of 1989, comedian, actor
- Avery Brooks, Class of 1973, actor, educator
- Morayo Afolabi-Brown, Class of 2002, Nigerian TV talk show host/presenter
- John Carpenter, Class of 1990, first-ever champion of Who Wants to Be a Millionaire television quiz show
- Asia Carrera (born Jessica Steinhauser), Class of 1995 (did not graduate), porn star; majored in Business and Japanese
- Kevin Chamberlin, Class of 1985, actor (Tony Award nominations for Dirty Blonde and Seussical)
- Larry Charles, film director (Borat and Bruno)
- Esther Choi, chef and media personality
- Jim Coane, Class of 1970, Emmy award-winning television executive producer, writer and director (Dragon Tales)
- Mike Colter, actor (Netflix's Luke Cage)
- Jessica Darrow, Class of 2017, actress and singer, voice of Luisa Madrigal in Disney's Encanto
- Kristin Davis, Class of 1987, actress (Sex and the City)
- Tim DeKay, Class of 1990 (Mason Gross School of the Arts), actor (White Collar)
- John DiMaggio, voice actor (Bender on Futurama and Jake the Dog on Adventure Time), voicework in anime (Princess Mononoke, Vampire Hunter D: Bloodlust)
- Katie Dippold, television and film writer (Parks and Recreation, The Heat)
- Wheeler Winston Dixon, filmmaker, critic, author
- Keir Dullea, actor (2001: A Space Odyssey)
- Simon Feil, Class of 2000, actor (Julie & Julia, House of Cards)
- Jon Finkel, Class of 2003, professional Magic: The Gathering player; inducted into the MTG Hall of Fame
- Calista Flockhart, Class of 1988, actress (The Birdcage, Ally McBeal), Emmy winner, spouse of Harrison Ford
- Brandon Flynn, Class of 2016, actor (13 Reasons Why)
- Marlene Forte (attended), actress, sister of HSN host Lesley Machado
- Gwendolyn Audrey Foster, filmmaker, critic, author
- Midori Francis, actress (Dash & Lily)
- James Gandolfini, Class of 1983, actor (The Sopranos), Emmy winner, voice actor (Where the Wild Things Are)
- Chris Gethard, comedian, actor
- Judy Gold, B.A. 1984, comedian, actress
- Dan Green, voice actor (Yu-Gi-Oh!)
- Charles Hallahan, Class of 1969 (Camden), actor (The Thing, Hunter)
- Robert Harper, Class of 1974, actor (Once Upon a Time in America, Frank's Place, Creepshow, Commander in Chief...)
- Bakhtiyaar Irani, Class of 1999, Indian television actor, participant in the Indian version of Big Brother, Bigg Boss
- Bill Jemas, Class of 1980, writer, creative director, publisher for Marvel Comics Group
- Ed Kalegi, national talk radio host and personality The Weekend with Ed Kalegi, actor
- Jason Kaplan, associate producer of The Howard Stern Show
- Jane Krakowski, Class of 1988, actress (Ally McBeal, 30 Rock)
- Angie Martinez, radio host of Power 105, Honorary degree
- William Mastrosimone, Class of 1980, playwright, Golden Globe Award winner
- Christopher McCulloch, creator of The Venture Bros.
- Paolo Montalban, Broadway, television and film actor
- Luis Moro, Class of 1987, actor, comic, filmmaker, writer, Independent Spirit Award nominee, Best Actor nominee ABFF (Love and Suicide)
- Oswald "Ozzie" Nelson, Class of 1927, musician and actor (The Adventures of Ozzie and Harriet)
- Nicolas Nuvan, social media influencer on Instagram and TikTok
- Daniel O'Brien, Class of 2008, comedian/writer (Cracked.com, How to Fight Presidents)
- Scott Patterson, actor (Saw IV, Saw V)
- Lauren Phillips, adult film actress
- Hasan Piker, Twitch streamer and left-wing political commentator
- Matt Pinfield, radio DJ, host of MTV's 120 Minutes
- Molly Price, actress
- Robert Pulcini, Class of 1989 (Camden), Academy Award-nominated documentary and feature filmmaker, co-director of American Splendor
- Sheryl Lee Ralph, English Lit/Theatre degree, 1975, original Deena Jones in the Broadway smash hit musical Dreamgirls, winner of six Tony Awards
- Dan Salvato, Class of 2014, video game creator, developed (Doki Doki Literature Club!)
- Roy Scheider, actor (Jaws, Sorcerer)
- Henry Selick, attended for a year, director (The Nightmare Before Christmas, Coraline)
- Michael Sorvino, actor, son of Paul Sorvino
- Dina Spybey, actress (Disney's The Haunted Mansion)
- Sebastian Stan, Class of 2005, actor (Captain America: The First Avenger, The Covenant)
- Aaron Stanford, Class of 2000, actor (X2, Tadpole)
- Kurt Sutter, Class of 1986, writer (The Shield), creator of Sons of Anarchy
- Paul Wesley, actor (The Vampire Diaries)
- Ashley Woodfolk, young adult fiction writer
- Karen Young, actress (The Sopranos, Law & Order)
- Ramy Youssef, attended, actor (Ramy)
- Saul Zaentz, film producer (One Flew over the Cuckoo's Nest, Amadeus)

==== Journalism ====
- Spencer Ackerman, Class of 2002, journalist for The Daily Beast
- Joan Acocella, Class of 1984, journalist, author, dance critic for The New Yorker
- Martin Agronsky, Class of 1936, pioneering TV journalist
- Amanda Alcantara, Class of 2012, writer and activist
- Carrie Budoff Brown, editor of Politico
- Lisa Daftari, foreign affairs investigative journalist for the Foreign Desk
- Stuart Diamond, journalist, New York Times, Pulitzer Prize; author of Getting More, NY Times bestseller
- Dylan Dreyer, meteorologist
- Rich Edson, Class of 2003, Washington correspondent, Fox News Channel
- Mike Emanuel, journalist, chief congressional correspondent and former White House correspondent for Fox News Channel
- Nick Gillespie, Class of 1985, journalist, editor
- Bernard Goldberg, Class of 1967, journalist
- Jerry Izenberg, Class of 1952, Emmy-winning sports journalist
- Amani Al-Khatahtbeh, Class of 2014, author and tech entrepreneur
- Jeff Koyen, Class of 1991, journalist and entrepreneur
- Gene Lyons, Class of 1952, political columnist
- Chi Modu, Class of 1989, photojournalist
- Natalie Morales, Class of 1994, journalist and correspondent for The Today Show
- Richard Newcomb, Class of 1962, journalist and author, best-selling author of Iwo Jima! and Abandon Ship!
- James O'Keefe, Class of 2006, political activist
- Wendy Osefo, Class of 2016 (Camden, PhD), political commentator and assistant professor at Johns Hopkins University
- Rebecca Quick, Class of 1993, journalist and anchor (CNBC's Squawk Box)
- Larry Stark, Class of 1956, Boston journalist and theater critic, Theater Mirror
- Mike Taibbi, Class of 1971, journalist and correspondent for NBC Nightly News
- Milton Viorst, Class of 1951, journalist, author, Middle East scholar
- Cathy Young, Class of 1988, journalist and non-fiction author

==== Music ====
- Kenny Barron, jazz pianist in Dizzie Gillespie quartet
- Regina Belle, singer ("A Whole New World")
- Laurie Berkner, children's musician, Jack's Big Music Show
- Just Blaze, Grammy Award-nominated hip hop producer
- David Bryan, keyboardist and member of band Bon Jovi
- Tyler Clementi, violinist who died by suicide after a roommate used a webcam to spy on him
- Jim Conti, tenor saxophonist for the third wave ska band Streetlight Manifesto
- Mike Glita, musician, producer, songwriter, manager, and former bassist for New Jersey post-hardcore band Senses Fail
- Roger Lee Hall, music preservationist, composer
- Mark Helias, bassist, composer
- Frank Iero, guitarist and backup vocals for the band My Chemical Romance; lead singer of post-hardcore/screamo band Leathermouth; co-founder of the Skeleton Crew company (dropped out, was on a scholarship)
- Ben Jelen, musician
- Brian Joo, Korean R&B singer; half of Fly to the Sky
- Tomas Kalnoky, lead singer-songwriter and lead guitarist of third wave ska band Streetlight Manifesto; formed Catch 22 and Bandits of the Acoustic Revolution
- Lenny Kaye, lead guitarist for the Patti Smith Group
- Kenneth Lampl, Juilliard School faculty, film, television, and choral music composer, and professor
- Dan Lavery, Grammy-nominated bass player for rock group Tonic and occasionally The Fray
- Looking Glass, 1970s band, one-hit wonder with the song "Brandy"
- Earl MacDonald, Class of 1995 (M.Mus.), director of Jazz Studies at the University of Connecticut; former musical director; pianist with Maynard Ferguson
- Marissa Paternoster, artist; lead singer-songwriter and lead guitarist of independent rock band Screaming Females and solo project Noun
- Cristina Pato, Galician bagpiper
- Pras, Grammy-winning rapper from the Fugees
- Geoff Rickly, musician of post-hardcore band Thursday
- James Romig, Class of 2000 (Ph.D.), composer; 2019 Pulitzer Prize in Music, finalist
- Gabe Saporta, musician with Midtown, Cobra Starship, and Humble Beginnings
- Rasika Shekar, Indo-American flautist and singer, plays the bansuri, a bamboo flute
- Soraya, Colombian-American singer-songwriter, guitarist, arranger and record producer
- Sister Souljah, born Lisa Williamson, Class of 1986, author

=== Athletics ===
==== Baseball ====
- Jason Bergmann, starting pitcher for the Washington Nationals
- Joe Borowski, relief pitcher for the Cleveland Indians; played for the Chicago Cubs, Florida Marlins, New York Yankees, Atlanta Braves, Baltimore Orioles, and Tampa Bay Devil Rays
- David DeJesus, center fielder for the Oakland Athletics
- Tom Emanski, creator of Tom Emanski Instructional Videos
- Jeff Frazier, plays for the Washington Nationals organization; brother of Todd Frazier
- Todd Frazier, plays for the Texas Rangers; member of the 1998 LLWS champions, Toms River, New Jersey
- Joshua Kuroda-Grauer, shortstop for the Athletics
- Don Taussig (born 1932), Major League Baseball player
- Jeff Torborg, Class of 1963, Major League Baseball catcher (Los Angeles Dodgers and California Angels); manager of several teams
- Eric Young, Class of 1992, Major League Baseball player

==== Basketball ====
- Ace Bailey, forward for the Utah Jazz; 5th pick in 2025 NBA Draft
- James Bailey, Class of 1978, NBA: 1979–1987
- John Battle, guard for the Atlanta Hawks and Cleveland Cavaliers, 1985–1995
- Hollis Copeland, NBA, 1979–1981
- Waliyy Dixon, AND1 Mixtape Tour streetball legend
- Quincy Douby, former NBA guard for the Sacramento Kings and Toronto Raptors
- Brian Ellerbe, Class of 1985, head coach of the Michigan Wolverines
- Luis Flores, professional basketball player, 2009 top scorer in the Israel Basketball Premier League
- Bob Greacen, NBA: 1969–1971
- Dylan Harper, guard for the San Antonio Spurs; second overall pick in the 2025 NBA Draft
- Ron Harper Jr., Class of 2022, NBA/G-League: 2022–present
- Art Hillhouse, NBA: 1946–1947
- Roy Hinson, Class of 1983, NBA: 1983–1990
- Charles Jones, NBA: 1999–1999
- Dahntay Jones, NBA: 2003–2017
- Eddie Jordan, Class of 1977, head coach of the Rutgers Men's Basketball team; former head coach of the Washington Wizards
- Steve Kaplan, Class of 1972, American-Israeli basketball player in the Israel Basketball Premier League
- Herve Lamizana, Class of 2004, power forward, Indios de Mayagüez
- Bob Lloyd, NBA: 1967–1968 professional player with the New York Nets; CEO of Mindscape; chairman of the V Foundation for Cancer Research which honors the memory of his former Rutgers backcourt teammate, Jim "Jimmy V." Valvano
- Hamady N'Diaye, Class of 2010, 26th pick of the second round (56th selection overall) in the 2010 NBA draft to play for the Minnesota Timberwolves; his draft rights have been traded to the Washington Wizards
- Chelsea Newton, Class of 2004, Sacramento Monarchs of the WNBA
- Arthur Perry, basketball player and coach
- Cappie Pondexter, Class of 2006, 2nd overall pick in the 2006 WNBA Draft by the Phoenix Mercury; 2008 Summer Olympic gold medalist for United States Women's Basketball in Beijing
- Phil Sellers, NBA: 1976–1976
- David Stern, Class of 1963, commissioner of the National Basketball Association
- Tammy Sutton-Brown, Class of 2001, Charlotte Sting of the WNBA
- Jim Valvano, Class of 1967, won NCAA Men's Basketball National Championship at N.C. State
- Sue Wicks, Class of 1988, member of the 1988 Olympic team and New York Liberty (1997–2002) of the WNBA
- Heather Zurich, Class of 2009, player; assistant coach of the UC Santa Barbara Gauchos team

==== Fencing ====
- Alex Treves (born 1929), Italian-born American Olympic fencer, won the NCAA saber title in both 1949 and 1950, was undefeated in three years of competing in college

==== Football ====
- Mike Barr, Class of 2004, NFL punter (Pittsburgh Steelers, Frankfurt Galaxy)
- Marco Battaglia, Class of 1996, NFL tight end (Cincinnati Bengals, Pittsburgh Steelers)
- Steve Belichick, Class of 2011, assistant coach for the New England Patriots
- Jay Bellamy, Class of 1994, NFL safety (New Orleans Saints)
- Brandon Bing, Class of 2011, safety for the New York Giants
- Gary Brackett, Class of 2003, NFL linebacker (Indianapolis Colts)
- Chris Brantley, Class of 1992, NFL player (Rams, Bills)
- Kenny Britt, Class of 2010 (did not graduate), NFL player (Titans)
- Frank Burns, Class of 1949, NFL quarterback (Philadelphia Eagles), head coach at Rutgers 1973–1983
- Michael Burton, Class of 2010, fullback for the Detroit Lions
- Deron Cherry, Class of 1980, safety with the Kansas City Chiefs; member of the NFL 1980s All-Decade Team
- Anthony Davis, Class of 2010, NFL offensive tackle (San Francisco 49ers)
- Jack Emmer, Class of 1967, NFL wide receiver (New York Jets); Hall of Fame college lacrosse coach; head coach of 2002 U.S. Lacrosse World Champions
- Eric Foster, Class of 2008, NFL defensive tackle (Indianapolis Colts)
- Gary Gibson, Class of 2005, NFL defensive tackle (Carolina Panthers)
- Clark Harris, Class of 2007, NFL tight end (Houston Texans)
- Homer Hazel, "Pop Hazel", All-American football star and member of the College Football Hall of Fame
- Carl Howard, Class of 1984, NFL cornerback (New York Jets)
- Jeremy Ito, Class of 2008
- James Jenkins, Class of 1991, NFL tight end (Washington Redskins)
- Ed Jones, Class of 1974, CFL All-Star
- Nate Jones, Class of 2004, NFL cornerback Miami Dolphins)
- Rashod Kent, Class of 2003, NFL tight end (Houston Texans)
- Alex Kroll, Class of 1962, AFL center (New York Titans), CEO of Young & Rubicam
- Brian Leonard, Class of 2007, NFL running back (Cincinnati Bengals)
- Steve Longa, linebacker (Detroit Lions)
- Ray Lucas, Class of 1996, NFL quarterback 1996–2002 (New York Jets, Miami Dolphins), TV football commentator
- Dino Mangiero, Class of 1980, NFL defensive end (Seattle Seahawks)
- Devin McCourty, Class of 2010, Pro Bowl NFL cornerback ( New England Patriots)
- Jason McCourty, Class of 2009, NFL cornerback (Tennessee Titans)
- Mike McMahon, Class of 2001, NFL quarterback (Minnesota Vikings)
- Bo Melton, Class of 2022, NFL wide receiver (Green Bay Packers)
- Robert Nash, "Nasty Nash", first football player traded in the NFL and first captain of the New York Giants
- Ryan Neill, Class of 2006, NFL defensive end (Buffalo Bills)
- Shaun O'Hara, Class of 2000, NFL center (New York Giants)
- Raheem Orr, Class of 2004, NFL defensive end, AFL DL/OL (Houston Texans, Philadelphia Soul)
- Isiah Pacheco, Class of 2022, NFL, running back (Kansas City Chiefs)
- J'Vonne Parker, Class of 2004, NFL defensive tackle (Cleveland Browns)
- Bill Pellington, Class of 1952, NFL linebacker (Baltimore Colts)
- Bill Pickel, Class of 1982, NFL defensive tackle (Los Angeles Raiders)
- Joe Porter, Class of 2007, NFL cornerback (Green Bay Packers)
- Nick Prisco, NFL player
- Ray Rice, NFL running back (Baltimore Ravens)
- Paul Robeson, Class of 1919, athlete, actor, singer, political activist, NFL guard 1920–1922 (Akron Pros, Milwaukee Badgers)
- Stan Rosen (1906–1984), NFL football player
- Mohamed Sanu, Class of 2012, wide receiver (Cincinnati Bengals)
- Tom Savage, attended, quarterback (Houston Texans)
- L.J. Smith, Class of 2003, NFL tight end (Philadelphia Eagles)
- Pedro Sosa, Class of 2008, offensive lineman (Miami Dolphins)
- Darnell Stapleton, Class of 2007, NFL guard (Pittsburgh Steelers)
- Reggie Stephens, Class of 1999, cornerback (New York Giants)
- Cameron Stephenson, Class of 2007, NFL guard (Jacksonville Jaguars)
- Tyronne Stowe, Class of 1987, linebacker (Phoenix Cardinals)
- Harry Swayne, Class of 1986, NFL lineman 1987–2001
- Rashod Swinger, NFL DT 1997–1999 (Arizona Cardinals)
- Mike Teel, Class of 2009, NFL quarterback 2009–2011 (Seattle Seahawks), quarterbacks coach (Kean University, Wagner College)
- Lou Tepper, Class of 1967, former head coach of Illinois
- Tiquan Underwood, Class of 2009, wide receiver (New England Patriots)
- Elnardo Webster, Class of 1992, NFL player, Pittsburgh Steelers
- Sonny Werblin, Class of 1932, founder of the New York Jets; president and CEO Madison Square Garden Corporation; president of Music Corporation of America-TV
- Jamaal Westerman, Class of 2009, NFL player, linebacker and defensive end (Jets)
- Jeremy Zuttah, Class of 2008, offensive lineman (Tampa Bay Buccaneers)

==== Powerlifting ====
- Lev Susany, Class of 2011, Australian powerlifter and Commonwealth record holder

==== Soccer ====
- Jon Conway, Class of 1999, goalkeeper for Chicago Fire
- Josh Gros, Class of 2003, midfielder for D.C. United
- Lev Kirshner, soccer player and San Diego State University men's soccer coach
- Nick LaBrocca, Class of 2006, midfielder for Colorado Rapids
- Alexi Lalas, Class of 1991, former U.S. Soccer National Team member, former president and general manager of the Los Angeles Galaxy
- Carli Lloyd, midfielder for the United States women's national soccer team and the Manchester City W.F.C.
- Steve Mokone, player for FC Barcelona and South Africa
- Peter Vermes, Class of 1987, former U.S. Soccer National Team member, former professional player in Major League Soccer

==== Swimming ====
- George Kojac, member of the International Swimming Hall of Fame; gold medalist in swimming at the 1928 Summer Olympics
- Walter Spence, member of International Swimming Hall of Fame; broke five world records in his first year of competitive swimming (1925)

==== Wrestling ====
- Anthony Ashnault, 2019 NCAA Wrestling Champion, 149 lb weight class; 4-time NCAA All-American
- Nick Catone, retired professional mixed martial artist who competed in the UFC
- Nick Suriano, 2019 NCAA Wrestling Champion, 133 lb weight class, first wrestling national champion for Rutgers

==== MMA ====
- Mickey Gall, professional mixed martial arts fighter, currently fighting in the Welterweight Division of the UFC

==== Hockey ====
- Andrew Barroway, hedge fund manager, minority owner of the Arizona Coyotes of the National Hockey League

=== Business ===
- Greg Brown, Class of 1982, president and co-CEO of Motorola; CEO of the Broadband Mobility Solutions Business Unit
- John Joseph "Jack" Byrne, Jr., chairman and CEO of GEICO which he pulled from the brink of insolvency in the mid-1970s; chairman and CEO of White Mountains Insurance Group, formerly (Fund American Enterprises, Inc.); chairman of the board of Overstock.com 2005–06
- Arturo L. Carrión Muñoz, former executive vice president of the Puerto Rico Bankers Association
- Stephen Chazen, CEO of Occidental Petroleum
- Jay Chiat, Class of 1953, founder of TBWA\Chiat\Day advertising
- Alvaro de Molina, Class of 1988, MBA, retired CFO of Bank of America
- Marc Ecko, founder of Complex magazine and CEO of Marc Ecko Enterprises
- Mark Fields, B.A. Economics, president and chief executive officer of Ford Motor Company
- Sharon Fordham, Class of 1975, CEO of WeightWatchers.com, Inc.
- Robert L. Fornaro, CEO of Spirit Airlines
- Otto Hermann Kahn, Rutgers Trustee, financier, patron of the arts
- Rana Kapoor, founder/CEO of Yes Bank
- Maryann Keller, Class of 1966, B.S., former president of Priceline.com automotive services division
- Leonor F. Loree, Class of 1877, president of the Pennsylvania Railroad
- Walt MacDonald, Class of 1974 (Camden), CEO of Educational Testing Services
- Duncan MacMillan, B.S. 1966, co-founder of Bloomberg L.P.
- Bernard Marcus, Class of 1951, founder of Home Depot
- Ernest Mario, Class of 1961, former CEO of GlaxoSmithKline
- Sherilyn McCoy, Class of 1988, MBA, CEO of Avon Products
- Gene Muller, Class of 1977 (Camden), founder and CEO of Flying Fish Brewing
- Edward H. Murphy Ph.D., retired from American Petroleum Institute
- George Norcross (Camden), insurance executive and chairman of Cooper Health System
- Randal Pinkett, Class of 1994, winner of The Apprentice 4; chairman and CEO of BCT Partners
- Robert C. Pruyn, Class of 1869, president of the Embossing Company, and the National Commercial Bank of Albany
- Bill Rasmussen, Class of 1960 MBA, founder of ESPN
- Tom Renyi, Class of 1968 (BA) and 1969 (MBA), former chairman and CEO of Bank of New York
- Gary Rodkin, former ConAgra CEO
- Barry Schuler, Class of 1976, former chairman and CEO of AOL
- Bill Schultz, Class of 1971, MBA, former CEO of Fender Musical Instruments
- Harvey Schwartz, Class of 1987, CEO of the Carlyle Group, former president and co-chief operating officer of Goldman Sachs
- Steven H. Temaras, CEO of Bed Bath and Beyond
- Sir William Cornelius Van Horne, former president of the Canadian Pacific Railway and builder of that country's Transcontinental railroad
- Robin Wiessmann, JD, director of Pennsylvania Housing Finance Agency
- William Bernard Ziff, Jr., Ziff Davis Inc. publishing executive

=== Crime ===
- Nidal Ayyad, B.S. 1991, one of the perpetrators of the 1993 World Trade Center bombing
- Rana Kapoor, M.B.A. 1980, convicted for embezzlement and fraud worth $100 million
- Melanie McGuire, B.S. 1994, convicted of murdering her husband, dismembering his body and putting it in suitcases

=== Education ===
- Philip Milledoler Brett, A.B. 1892, acting president of Rutgers University (1930–1931); corporate attorney
- Carol T. Christ, A.B. 1966, former president of Smith College and current chancellor of U.C. Berkeley
- Tom S. Clark, B.A., Charles Howard Candler Professor of Political Science at Emory University
- Stuart Diamond, the Wharton School of Business, professor of Negotiations, Legal Studies Department; A.B. 1970, J.D. Harvard, 1990, M.B.A. Wharton (Univ. of PA), 1992
- Alvin S. Felzenberg, historian, political commentator, member of 9/11 Commission
- Charles Ferster, B.S. 1947, behavioral psychologist, author and professor (deceased 1981)
- Richard H. Fink, founder of Mercatus Center, current executive vice president at Koch Industries
- Milton Friedman, A.B. 1932, economist; public intellectual; winner of the Nobel Prize in Economics (1976)
- William H. S. Demarest, A.B. 1883, professor of Theology and Church Government; president of Rutgers University (1906–1924), president of New Brunswick Theological Seminary
- Brigid Callahan Harrison, political science professor and academic at Montclair State University
- Jerome Kagan, B.S. 1950, psychologist
- Maureen Kenny, B.A. 1989, professor of Psychology at Florida International University
- William English Kirwan, M.A. 1962, Ph.D. 1964, mathematician; chancellor emeritus of the University System of Maryland (2002–2015); former president of Ohio State University (1998–2002)
- Melissa Klapper, Ph.D. 2001, historian and storyteller at Rowan University
- Sarah-Jane Leslie, B.A., dean of Princeton University Graduate School
- Earl MacDonald, Class of 1995 (M.Mus.), associate professor of Music at the University of Connecticut
- Lynn Mahoney, Ph.D. 1999, social historian, 14th president of San Francisco State University
- Richard P. McCormick, A.B. 1938, M.A. 1940, historian; professor of History and dean of faculty at Rutgers University; president of New Jersey Historical Society
- John McWhorter, B.A. 1985, historian; author of books on linguistics and race relations; former professor of linguistics at University of California, Berkeley; senior fellow at Manhattan Institute
- Uma Narayan, M.A. 1990, Indian feminist professor of philosophy at Vassar College
- Roy Franklin Nichols, A.B. 1918, M.A. 1919, historian, winner of the Pulitzer Prize (1949)
- John C. Norcross, B.S. 1980 (Camden) psychiatrist, university professor
- Dennis A. Rondinelli, B.A. 1965, professor and researcher of public administration at the Sanford School of Public Policy
- Camilla Townsend, Ph.D. 1995, professor of history at Rutgers-New Brunswick
- Selman Waksman, B.Sc. 1915 M.Sc. 1916, professor of microbiology, discovered 22 antibiotics (including streptomycin); winner of the Nobel Prize in Physiology or Medicine (1952)
- Carl R. Woodward, B.Sc. 1914, president of the University of Rhode Island

=== Government, law, and public policy ===
- Rosemary Alito, J.D. 1978, corporate and labor attorney for K&L Gates; sister of U.S. Sureme Court justice Samuel Alito
- Curt Anderson, member of Maryland House of Delegates (1983 -); chair of Legislative Black Caucus of Maryland (1989–1991)
- Stewart H. Appleby 1913, represented New Jersey's 3rd congressional district 1925–1927
- Thomas J. Aquilino, J.D. 1969, judge of the United States Court of International Trade, 1985–2004
- Adam Leitman Bailey, lawyer, defended the Ground Zero Mosque and other prominent cases
- Judith Barzilay, MLS 1971, J.D. 1981, judge of the United States Court of International Trade, 1998–2011
- Cheri Beasley, B.A. 1988, former chief justice of the North Carolina Supreme Court, candidate for 2022 United States Senate election in North Carolina
- Joseph P. Bradley, A.B. 1836, associate justice, United States Supreme Court (1870–1891)
- Sam Brown, M.A. 1966, organiser of the Vietnam Moratorium and former state treasurer of Colorado
- Wayne R. Bryant, J.D. 1972 (Camden), New Jersey senator (1995–2008)
- Donald Burdick, B.S. 1956, M.S., 1958, United States Army major general, served as director of the Army National Guard
- William T. Cahill, J.D. 1937 (Camden), 46th governor of New Jersey
- James Dickson Carr, B.A. 1892, first African-American assistant district attorney in the state of New York (1899–1901)
- Clifford P. Case, A.B. 1925, U.S. House of Representatives (1945–1953), United States Senate (1955–1979)
- Jennifer Choe-Groves, J.D. 1994, judge of the United States Court of International Trade, since 2016
- David A. Christian, J.D. 2011, retired United States Army captain and former candidate for the Republican nomination in the 2012 United States Senate election in Pennsylvania
- Chris Christie, 55th governor of New Jersey
- Megan Coyne, B.A. 2019, deputy director of Platforms at the White House under President Joe Biden
- James Dale, B.A. 1993, respondent in Boy Scouts of America et al. v. Dale
- Simeon De Witt, A.B. 1776, surveyor-general for the Continental Army, 1776–1783, and the State of New York, 1784–1834
- William K. Dickey, A.B. 1941 (Camden), J.D. 1944 (Camden), New Jersey General Assembly, 1963–1973, Speaker 1970
- Michael DuHaime, B.A., 1995, campaign manager, Rudy Giuliani for president, 2008; political director, Republican National Committee, 2005–2006; regional political director, Bush-Cheney '04, 2003–2004
- George S. Duryee B.A. 1872, member of the New Jersey State Assembly and The United States Attorney for the District of New Jersey
- Maria Fernanda Espinosa, former president of the United Nations General Assembly
- Alan Estevez, B.A. 1979, assistant secretary of Defense for Logistics and Material Readiness, 2011–2013; under secretary of Commerce for Industry and Security, since 2022
- Richard Fink, B.A. in economics, founded the Center for Study of Market Processes at Rutgers University
- James J. Florio, J.D. 1967 (Camden), 49th governor of New Jersey (1990–1994)
- Louis Freeh, Class of 1971, director of the FBI (1993–2001)
- Frederick T. Frelinghuysen, A.B. 1836, United States Senate (1866–1869, 1871–1877); secretary of state (1881–1885)
- Scott Garrett, J.D. 1984 (Newark), U.S. House of Representatives (2003–2017)
- Anthony Genatempo, B.S. Physics 1990, United States Air Force, major general, since 1991
- Scott Gration, Obama nominee for NASA Administrator
- John H. Griebel, B.S. 1926, Marine Corps general
- Diane Gutierrez-Scaccetti, M.S. 1987, nominee for commissioner of the New Jersey Department of Transportation
- Garret A. Hobart, A.B. 1863, industrialist, vice president of the United States (1897–1899)
- Elie Honig, 1997, assistant United States attorney and CNN senior legal analyst
- James J. Howard, M.Ed. 1958, represented New Jersey's 3rd congressional district in the United States House of Representatives 1965–1988
- Richard J. Hughes, J.D. 1931, New Jersey governor, chief State Supreme Court justice
- William Hughes, Class of 1955, congressman, U.S. ambassador to Panama
- Jack H. Jacobs, Class of 1966, M.A. 1972, Medal of Honor recipient, military analyst for MSNBC
- Robert E. Kelley, highly decorated and youngest lieutenant general in USAF history; superintendent of the United States Air Force Academy, 1981–83
- Herbert Klein, member, United States House of Representatives
- Stephanie Kusie, member of Canadian Parliament for Calgary Midnapore
- Nancy La Vigne, Ph.D. Class of 1996, director of the National Institute of Justice
- Joseph Lazarow, mayor of Atlantic City, New Jersey 1976–1982
- Kenneth LeFevre, B.S. 1976 (Camden), member of the New Jersey General Assembly 1996–2002
- Tim Louis, member of the Parliament of Canada
- George C. Ludlow, A.B. 1850, 25th governor of New Jersey
- Gail D. Mathieu, J.D (Newark), current U.S. ambassador to Namibia and former U.S. ambassador to Niger
- Dina Matos, former First Lady of New Jersey and ex-wife of former governor of New Jersey Jim McGreevey
- Ivy Matsepe-Casaburri, South African Minister of Communications (1999-)
- D. Bennett Mazur (c. 1925–1994), member of the New Jersey General Assembly
- Bob Menendez, J.D. (Newark), U.S. House of Representatives (1992–2005); United States senator (2006–2024)
- Anne Milgram, attorney general of New Jersey and first assistant attorney general of New Jersey
- A. Harry Moore, J.D., governor of New Jersey, U.S. senator from New Jersey
- Geoffrey H. Moore, ninth U.S. commissioner of the Bureau of Labor Statistics; known as the "father of business cycles"
- David A. Morse, A.B. 1929, director-general of ILO who accepted the Nobel Peace Prize in 1969 on behalf of the ILO
- Joseph A. Mussomeli, J.D. 1978 (Camden), former ambassador to Slovenia and Cambodia
- William A. Newell, A.B. 1836, physician; governor of New Jersey (1857–1860)
- George Norcross (Camden, attended), Democratic Party fundraiser, insurance and media executive
- Janet Norwood, first female commissioner of the Bureau of Labor Statistics when she was appointed by President Jimmy Carter; graduated from the New Jersey College of Women, which is now Douglass Residential College, in 1945; inducted into the Rutgers Hall of Distinguished Alumni in 1987 Hall of Distinguished Alumni
- Joy Ogwu, Nigerian representative to the United Nations and former foreign minister
- David Oh, J.D 1985 (Camden), Philadelphia city councilperson and 2023 mayoral candidate
- Hazel O'Leary, J.D., U.S. secretary of Energy (1993–1997)
- Edward J. Patten, J.D. 1927 (Newark), U.S. House of Representatives (1963–1980)
- Clark V. Poling, A.B. 1933, one of the Four Chaplains killed on the troop transport Dorchester
- Robert H. Pruyn, A.B. 1833, A.M. 1836, second U.S. ambassador to Japan
- Dana Redd, B.A. 1989 (Camden), mayor of Camden, New Jersey
- Matthew John Rinaldo, B.S. 1953, represented New Jersey in the United States House of Representatives for twenty years, in the 12th congressional district (1973–1983) and in the 7th congressional district (1983–1993)
- Richie Roberts (Newark), prosecutor who took down Frank Lucas, portrayed in the movie American Gangster
- Norman M. Robertson, New Jersey state senator
- Eduardo Robreno, J.D. 1978 (Camden), federal judge for the United States District Court for the Eastern District of Pennsylvania
- Peter W. Rodino, Jr., J.D. 1937, congressman
- Maria Rodriguez-Gregg, B.A. 2013 (Camden), member of the New Jersey General Assembly
- Esther Salas, J.D. 1991, United States district judge of the United States District Court for the District of New Jersey
- David Samson, B.A. 1961, New Jersey attorney general 2002–2003
- Salvatore Eugene Scalia, law clerk; father of U.S. Supreme Court justice Antonin Scalia
- Mike Schofield, B.A., Republican member of the Texas House of Representatives; former policy advisors to then Governor Rick Perry
- James Schureman, A.B. 1775, Continental Congress, senator
- Martin J. Silverstein, B.A. 1976, U.S. ambassador to Uruguay 2001–2005
- Alfred Ford Skinner, 1883, state representative, trustee of Rutgers University 1906–1915
- Gregory M. Sleet, J.D. 1976 (Camden), federal judge for the United States District Court for the District of Delaware
- Elliott F. Smith (1931–1987), politician who served in the New Jersey General Assembly 1978–1984, where he represented the 16th Legislative District (New Jersey)
- Jeremiah Smith, 6th governor of New Hampshire
- Mark Sokolich, B.A., mayor of Fort Lee, New Jersey
- Danene Sorace, MPP, mayor of Lancaster, Pennsylvania
- Darren Soto, B.A. 2000, U.S. House of Representatives Florida District 9, since 2014
- Bill Stepien, political consultant
- Louis W. Stotesbury (B.S., 1890, M.Sc., 1893), New York City attorney who served as the Adjutant General of New York
- Charles C. Stratton, 15th governor of New Jersey
- Gary Stuhltrager B.A. (Camden), J.D. (Camden), eight-term member of the New Jersey General Assembly
- Robert Torricelli, Class of 1974, United States senator, congressman
- Foster M. Voorhees, A.B. 1876, governor of New Jersey (1898, 1899–1902)
- Elizabeth Warren (Newark), United States senator (D-MA); chair of the Congressional Troubled Asset Relief Program (TARP)
- Wu Weihua, chairman of the Jiusan Society and the vice chairman of the Standing Committee of the National People's Congress of the People's Republic of China
- Jacob R. Wortendyke, 1839, represented New Jersey's 5th congressional district in the United States House of Representatives 1857–1859
- Barbara Wright, M.Ed., member of the New Jersey General Assembly

=== Library and information science ===
- Lily Amir-Arjomand M.L.S., founder of the children's public library system in Iran and former leader of the Iranian Institute for Intellectual Development of Children and Young Adults
- William B. Brahms B.A. 1989, M.L.S. 2003, librarian and reference book writer
- Ted Hines, M.L.S. 1958, Ph.D. 1960, librarian, pioneer in computer information cataloging systems

=== Literature ===
- Adaeze Atuegwu, Class of 2002, author
- Janine Benyus, natural sciences writer
- Holly Black (attended), author, Spiderwick Chronicles
- James Blish, Class of 1942, science fiction and fantasy author; wrote A Case of Conscience, winner of 1959 Hugo Award for Best Novel and 2004 Retrospective Hugo Award for Best Novella
- Lester Brown, Class of 1955, environmental analyst and author
- Marian Calabro, author and publisher of history books; founder and president of CorporateHistory.net
- Jonathan Carroll, Class of 1971, author
- Cheryl Clarke, Ph.D., class of 2000, poet, essayist, and activist
- Vincent Czyz, Class of 2002, author
- Junot Díaz, Class of 1991, author of The Brief Wondrous Life of Oscar Wao, winner of 2008 Pulitzer Prize for Fiction and 2007 National Book Critics Circle Award
- Denise Drace-Brownell, military writer
- Janet Evanovich, Class of 1965, best-selling author
- Michael Farber, sports journalist, Elmer Ferguson Memorial Award recipient, Hockey Hall of Fame selection committee member
- Richard Florida, author and public intellectual
- Jeremiah Healy, Class of 1970, crime novelist
- Alfred Joyce Kilmer, Class of 1908 (did not graduate), poet, died in France during World War I; author of "Trees"
- Paul Lisicky, Class of 1983 (Camden), MFA 1986 (Camden), author, creative writing professor, 2016 Guggenheim Fellow
- Lawrence Millman, Ph.D., travel writer and mycologist
- Richard A. Moran, Ph.D., class of 1972, author of 10 books on management
- Ankhi Mukherjee, Ph.D., professor of literature at University of Oxford
- Ira B. Nadel, Class of 1965, M.A. in 1967, biographer, literary critic, distinguished professor at University of British Columbia
- Daniel Nester, Class of 1991 (Camden), poet and essayist
- Fabian Nicieza, Class of 1983, comic book writer and editor; X-Men, X-Force, New Warriors, Cable and Deadpool, Thunderbolts
- Daniel O'Brien, Class of 2008, humorist and novelist
- Gregory Pardlo, Class of 1999 (Camden), poet, recipient of the 2015 Pulitzer Prize for Poetry
- Robert Pinsky, Class of 1962, Poet Laureate of the United States, Pulitzer Prize nominee
- Nina Raginsky, Class of 1962, photographer
- Katherine Ramsland, true-crime author, professor of forensics psychology at DeSales University
- Philip Roth (Newark; attended), author
- Rudy Rucker, masters and PhD in mathematics, author of science fiction as well as non-fiction books on mathematics, computer programming, and the future of technology
- Michael Shaara, Class of 1951, author of The Killer Angels, winner of 1975 Pulitzer Prize for Fiction
- Doris Sommer, professor of Romance Languages at Harvard University
- Judith Viorst, children's literature author; Alexander and the Terrible, Horrible, No Good, Very Bad Day
- Dave White, Class of 2001, Derringer Award-winning mystery author
- Wesley Yang, essayist, columnist for Tablet magazine, author of The Souls of Yellow Folk

=== Medicine ===
- Michael S. Gottlieb, Class of 1969, first physician to identify acquired immune deficiency syndrome (AIDS) as a new disease
- David M. Greenberg, psychologist, neuroscientist, and musician
- Howard Krein, otolaryngologist and plastic surgeon, husband of Ashley Biden and son-in-law of 46th United States President Joe Biden
- Constantine Mavroudis, surgeon known for his work in pediatric and congenital heart surgery
- James Oleske, pediatrician who published one of the first articles identifying HIV/AIDS in children
- Sandra Saouaf, immunologist
- Albert Schatz, graduate assistant to Selman Waksman, co-discovered streptomycin
- Selman Waksman, Class of 1915, discovered 22 antibiotics, best known for streptomycin; Nobel laureate; Waksman Institute of Microbiology and Waksman Hall are named in his honor

=== Religion ===
- Vernon Grounds (B.A. 1937), theologian, Christian educator, chancellor of Denver Seminary, one of the founders of American Evangelicalism
- Eugene Augustus Hoffman (A.Bz. 1847), dean and "Our Most Munificent Benefactor" of the General Theological Seminary of the Episcopal Church (New York City)
- Matthew Leydt (A.B. 1774), Rutgers' first alumnus and Dutch-Reformed minister
- William P. Merrill (D.D. 1904), first president of the Church Peace Union, writer of "Rise Up, O Men of God"
- Michael Plekon (Master's in Sociology and Religion 1977), priest, author, sociologist and theologian
- Clark V. Poling, Dutch-Reformed Army chaplain among the "Four Chaplains" on the troop transport Dorchester during World War II
- Robert Searle (minister) (B.A. 1915), Presbyterian minister and nonprofit executive

=== Royalty ===
- Ewuare II, Oba of Benin

=== Science and technology ===
- Eva Andrei, condensed matter physicist
- N. Peter Armitage, physicist and professor at Johns Hopkins University
- Valerie Barr, computer scientist known for her work with women in computing; former chair of ACM's Council on Women in Computing
- Santanu Bhattacharya, PhD 1989, chemical biologist and materials chemist at the Indian Institute of Science
- Wendy Brewster, professor of Obstetrics and Gynaecology at the University of North Carolina at Chapel Hill
- Noam Brown, Class of 2008, research scientist at OpenAI.
- Yingying Chen, computer scientist, chair of the Department of Electrical and Computer Engineering at Rutgers
- Angela Christiano, molecular geneticist in dermatology at Columbia University
- Stanley N. Cohen, Class of 1956, geneticist, pioneer in gene splicing
- Robert Cooke, first researcher to identify antihistamines
- Bergen Davis, American physicist and a professor at Columbia University
- Simeon De Witt, A.B. 1776, geographer for George Washington and Continental Army during the American Revolution
- Jean Dickey, geodesist and particle physicist
- Leonard Feldman, PhD 1967, materials physicist
- Gregory Gabadadze, theoretical physicist specializing in gravity, cosmology and particle physics
- Louis Gluck, Class of 1930, engineer; considered the "father of neonatology", the science of caring for newborns
- Elma González, PhD 1972, plant cell biologist
- Philip R. Goode, theoretical physicist
- Thomas H. Haines, biochemist, father of Director of National Intelligence Avril Haines
- Danielle Hairston, psychiatrist; faculty at Howard University College of Medicine
- Terry Hart, Class of 1978, astronaut, president of LORAL Skynet
- Daria Hazuda, B.S., biochemist known for discovering the first HIV integrase strand transfer inhibitors
- George William Hill, Class of 1859, mathematician and astronomer, first president of the American Mathematical Society
- George Duryea Hulst, clergyman, botanist, entomologist
- John Iacono, PhD 2001, computer scientist, former professor of computer science at New York University, professor at Université libre de Bruxelles
- Mir Imran, Class of 1976, BS Electrical Engineering (1976), MS Bio Engineering (1978), winner of 2005 Rutgers University Distinguished Engineer Award
- Nathalie Japkowicz, PhD 1999, computer scientist and professor specializing in machine learning
- Sachidananda Kangovi, Class of 1977, known for developing Service Linked Multi-State system (SLIMS), a critical part of the Telecom provisioning and activation system
- Geraldine Knatz, Class of 1973, first female port director of the Port of Los Angeles
- Stefan Langerman, Belgian computer scientist and mathematician
- Jason Locasale, Class of 2003, scientist; pioneer in the area of modern metabolism research
- Richard Swann Lull, paleontologist
- Harry A. Marmer, oceanographer
- George Willard Martin, mycologist and academic
- Deborah McGuinness, computer scientist and professor at Rensselaer Polytechnic Institute
- Charles Molnar, inventor of personal computer LINC (acknowledged as the 1st personal computer by IEEE)
- Luboš Motl, string theorist, blogger and former physics professor at Harvard
- Maureen Murphy, Class of 1987, cancer researcher
- Nathan M. Newmark, Class of 1948, inventor of the Newmark-beta method of numerical integration used to solve differential equations; winner of the National Medal of Science
- Daniel G. Nocera, Class of 1979, chemist noted for work on proton coupled electron transfer
- Eva J. Pell, Class of 1972, plant pathologist
- Lorien Pratt, computer scientist and machine learning researcher
- Jaikumar Radhakrishnan, computer scientist specialising in combinatorics and communication complexity
- Edward Rebar, biologist
- Barbara G. Ryder, PhD 1982, computer scientist noted for her research on programming languages
- Carl Safina, writer and ecological scientist
- Hava Siegelmann, PhD 1993, computer scientist and professor at the University of Massachusetts Amherst
- Peter C. Schultz, Class of 1964, co-inventor of fiber optics
- John Scudder, physician; research pioneer in the field of blood storage and replacement
- Raymond Seeger, Class of 1926, physicist, fluid dynamics researcher, winner of the Navy Distinguished Public Service Award
- Harold Hill Smith, geneticist, responsible for fusing human and plant cells
- Ileana Streinu, computer scientist and mathematician
- Jessica Ware, entomologist at American Museum of Natural History
- Elaine Weyuker, computer scientist and researcher in software engineering
- Terrie Williams, marine biologist and ecophysiologist
- Tao Yang, professor of Computer Science at the University of California, Santa Barbara
- Heather Zichal, deputy assistant to the president for Energy and Climate Change in Obama Administration

=== Social sciences ===
- Dorothy Cantor, Psy.D. 1976, former president of the American Psychological Association
- Alycia Halladay, chief science officer of Autism Science Foundation
- Patricia Fernandez-Kelly, Sociologist/Professor at Princeton University, Director of Center for Migration and Development at Princeton University

== Notable faculty ==
=== Arts ===
- Emma Amos, professor of fine arts; postmodernist painter and printmaker; member of Spiral; editorial board member of feminist journal Heresies; member of Fantastic Women in the Arts
- Julianne Baird, professor of music (Camden), soprano
- Vivian E. Browne, painter, professor of art
- Angelin Chang, former associate professor of music; Grammy Award-winning classical pianist
- Leon Golub, professor of fine arts
- Al Hansen, professor of finer arts; a founder of Fluxus
- Amanda Harberg, professor of music, composer
- Geoffrey Hendricks, professor of fine arts
- Allan Kaprow, professor of fine arts
- Avi Lewis, lecturer
- Roy Lichtenstein, professor of fine arts
- Robert Moevs, professor of music
- George Segal, professor of fine arts; Fluxus artist
- LiQin Tan, professor and co-director of art program
- Robert Watts, professor of fine arts
- Charles Wuorinen, professor of music; Pulitzer Prize-winning composer and MacArthur fellow

=== Economics ===
- Harry Gideonse (1901–1985), president of Brooklyn College, and chancellor of the New School for Social Research

=== Library and information science ===
- Marc Aronson, professor of Library and Information Science, author and historian
- Nicholas J. Belkin, professor of Library and Information science
- Paul S. Dunkin, professor emeritus of Library Services
- Elizabeth Futas, professor of Library and Information Science
- Peggy Sullivan, lecturer

=== Literature ===
- Miguel Algarín, professor of English
- Giannina Braschi, professor of Spanish, author of Yo-Yo Boing! and United States of Banana
- John Ciardi, professor of English, poet, translator of Dante's The Divine Comedy
- Mark Doty, professor of English, poet
- William C. Dowling, professor of English
- Ralph Ellison, author of Invisible Man
- Francis Fergusson, professor of English, literary critic
- H. Bruce Franklin, John Cotton Dana Professor of English and American Studies (Newark); expert on Herman Melville, science fiction, and prison literature
- Joanna Fuhrman, poet
- Paul Fussell, professor of English, author, literary critic, social commentator
- Rafey Habib, professor of Literature (Camden), poet
- Stanley Kunitz, visiting professor of Literature (Camden), poet
- Paul Lisicky, professor of English and Creative writing (Camden), author
- Alicia Ostriker, professor of English, poet
- Gregory Pardlo, professor of English (Camden), poet
- David S. Reynolds, professor of Literature (Camden), cultural critic

=== Medicine ===
- Mary G. Boland MSN, RN, FAAN, emeritus François-Xavier Bagnoud Chair of Nursing at the School of Nursing of the University of Medicine and Dentistry of New Jersey (later Rutgers University College of Nursing); associate dean emeritus for community programs at the Rutgers University College of Nursing
- René Joyeuse, MD, MS, FACS, Office of Strategic Services Allied intelligence agent during World War II, CMDNJ Assistant Professor of Surgery, co-founder of the American Trauma Society, involved in training physicians and EMS personnel in trauma care
- Michel Kahaleh, clinical director of Gastroenterology, chief of Endoscopy, and director of the Pancreas Program at the Department of Medicine, Robert Wood Johnson Medical School
- James Oleske MD, emeritus François-Xavier Bagnoud (FXB) Professor of Pediatrics at Rutgers New Jersey Medical School; one of the first physicians to recognize that children could be infected with HIV/AIDS
- Sidney Pestka, professor of Microbiology and Immunology at the Robert Wood Johnson Medical School; the "father of interferon"; received the National Medal of Technology
- Robert A. Schwartz, professor and head of Dermatology at the Rutgers New Jersey Medical School; co-discoverer of AIDS-associated Kaposi sarcoma and Schwartz-Burgess syndrome

=== Law ===
- Robert E. Andrews, adjunct professor at the School of Law in Camden, congressman, U.S. House of Representatives
- Ruth Bader Ginsburg, professor at the School of Law in Newark, associate justice of the Supreme Court of the United States
- Arthur Kinoy, professor at the School of Law in Newark; civil rights litigator for leftist causes
- Raphael Lemkin, professor of International Law at the School of Law in Newark; jurist who coined the term "genocide"; key drafter and campaigner for the UN Genocide Convention
- Wendell Pritchett, chancellor of Rutgers University–Camden, interim dean and Presidential Professor at the University of Pennsylvania Law School, and provost of the University of Pennsylvania

=== Mathematics ===
- Abbas Bahri (1955–2016), professor of mathematics
- József Beck, professor of mathematics
- Haim Brezis, professor of mathematics
- Israel Gelfand (1913–2009), professor of mathematics
- Daniel Gorenstein (1923–1992), professor of mathematics
- Samuel L. Greitzer (1905–1988), professor of mathematics, founding chairman of the United States of America Mathematical Olympiad
- András Hajnal (1931–2016), professor of mathematics
- Henryk Iwaniec, professor of mathematics
- Jeffry Ned Kahn, professor of mathematics
- János Komlós, professor of mathematics, winner of the Alfréd Rényi Prize (1975)
- Michael Saks, professor of mathematics, winner of the Gödel Prize (2004)
- Glenn Shafer (1992–present), professor of mathematical statistics, co-creator of the Dempster-Shafer theory
- Saharon Shelah, professor of mathematics
- Doron Zeilberger, professor of mathematics; winner of the Steele Prize for Seminal Contributions to Research (1998)

=== Philosophy ===
- Elisabeth Camp, associate professor of philosophy
- Ruth Chang, professor of philosophy
- Frances Egan, professor of philosophy
- Jerry Fodor, professor of philosophy and cognitive science
- Alvin Goldman, professor of philosophy
- Peter D. Klein, professor of philosophy
- Brian Leftow, William P. Alston Chair in Philosophy of Religion
- Ernest Lepore, professor of philosophy
- Barry Loewer, distinguished professor of philosophy and director of the Rutgers Center for Philosophy and the Sciences
- Alan Prince, professor of linguistics and cognitive science, founder of optimality theory
- Zenon Pylyshyn, professor of philosophy and cognitive science
- Theodore Sider, professor of philosophy
- Holly Martin Smith, Distinguished Professor of Philosophy
- Stephen Stich, professor of philosophy
- Larry Temkin, professor of philosophy
- Robert Weingard, professor of philosophy
- Samuel Merrill Woodbridge (1819–1905), professor of metaphysics and philosophy of the human mind (1857–1864)
- Dean Zimmerman, professor of philosophy

=== Physics ===
- Thomas Banks, professor of physics
- Girsh Blumberg, professor of physics
- Herman Carr, professor of physics, pioneer of magnetic resonance imaging
- Piers Coleman, professor of physics
- Michael R. Douglas, former professor of physics (now at Simons Center for Geometry and Physics, Stony Brook)
- Daniel Friedan, professor of physics
- Gabriel Kotliar, professor of physics
- Joel Lebowitz, professor of mathematical physics
- Neepa Maitra, professor of physics
- Gregory Moore, professor of physics
- Nathan Seiberg, former professor of physics (now at Institute for Advanced Study, Princeton)
- Stephen Shenker, former professor of physics (now at Stanford University)
- Rachel Somerville, professor of physics and astronomy
- David Vanderbilt, professor of physics
- Alexander Zamolodchikov, professor of physics

=== Science and engineering ===
- Jean Ruth Adams, entomologist and virologist
- Willard H. Allen, poultry scientist and New Jersey secretary of agriculture
- C. Olin Ball, professor of food engineering, chair of the Department of Food Science
- Richard Bartha, professor of microbiology and biochemistry; discoverer of "oil eating bacteria"
- Helen M. Berman, chemistry professor, former director of the RCSB Protein Data Bank
- Kenneth Breslauer, Linus C. Pauling professor of chemistry and chemical biology
- Stephen K. Burley, director of RCSB Protein Data Bank and the Center for Integrative Proteomics Research
- Stephen S. Chang, professor of food science and Nicholas Appert Award winner
- Albert Huntington Chester, mining engineer, professor of chemistry, mineralogy, and metallurgy, explorer, and namesake of Chester Peak
- Hettie Morse Chute, professor of botany
- Vašek Chvátal, professor of computer science
- George Hammell Cook, State Geologist of New Jersey and vice president of Rutgers College
- Michael R. Douglas, director of New High Energy Theory Center; Sackler Prize winner
- Richard H. Ebright, professor of chemistry
- Helen Fisher, research professor of anthropology
- Robin Fox, professor of anthropology
- Panos G. Georgopoulos, professor of environmental and occupational health science
- Apostolos Gerasoulis, professor of computer science; creator of the Teoma/Ask search engine
- Alan S. Goldman, professor of chemistry
- Chi-Tang Ho, professor of food science and Stephen S. Chang Award for Lipid or Flavor Science winner
- Tomasz Imielinski, professor of computer science
- Yogesh Jaluria, Board of Governors Professor and Distinguished Professor of Mechanical and Aerospace Engineering
- Paul B. Kantor, professor of information science
- Leonid Khachiyan, professor of computer science; creator of the first polynomial time algorithm for linear programming
- Lisa C. Klein, Distinguished Professor of Materials Science and Engineering
- Alan Leslie, professor of cognitive science and psychology
- Jing Li, chemist
- Paul J. Lioy, professor of Environmental and Occupational Medicine, UMDNJ, Robert Wood Johnson Medical School
- Michael L. Littman, professor of computer science
- Lujendra Ojha, assistant professor of planetary sciences
- Wilma Olson, professor of chemistry and physics, BioMAPS Institute for Quantitative Biology
- Lawrence Rabiner, professor of electrical and computer engineering
- Christopher Rose, professor of electrical and computer engineering
- Robert Schommer, astronomer, professor of physics
- Myron Solberg, professor of food science; founding director of the Center for Advanced Food Technology at Rutgers; Nicholas Appert Award winner
- Mario Szegedy, professor of computer science; two-time winner of Godel Prize
- Endre Szemerédi, professor of computer science
- Lionel Tiger, professor of anthropology
- Jay Tischfield, professor of genetics
- Robert Trivers, professor of anthropology and biological sciences and winner of the Crafoord Prize in Biosciences (2007)
- Kathryn Uhrich, professor of chemistry, area dean of Mathematical and Physical Sciences
- Selman Waksman, professor of microbiology and winner of the Nobel Prize in Physiology or Medicine (1952)
- Judith Weis, professor emeritus of marine biology
- Martin Yarmush, professor of biomedical and chemical & biochemical engineering, Fellow: US National Academy of Inventors and US National Academy of Engineering

=== Social sciences ===
- Stephen Bronner, professor of political science, comparative literature and German studies
- Ann Buchholtz, professor of Leadership and Ethics, research director of the Institute for Ethical Leadership
- Charlotte Bunch, founder and director of the Center for Women's Global Leadership, activist and author
- Arthur F. Burns, professor of economics, 10th chairman of the Federal Reserve
- Mason W. Gross, professor of classics, president of Rutgers University (1959–1971)
- Lauren Krivo, professor of sociology
- Paul Lazarsfeld, prominent sociologist and pioneering communication theorist (Newark)
- William D. Lutz, professor of linguistics (Camden), leading theorist on doublespeak
- Gerald M. Pomper, professor of political scientist, leading expert on election studies
- Robyn Rodriguez, former professor of sociology, established the first Filipino studies center in U.S. at U.C. Davis
- Alex Zamalin, professor of political science and Africana studies

=== History ===
- Leslie M. Alexander, Dr. Martin Luther King Jr. Professor of History
- Peter Charanis, Voorhees Professor of History; Byzantine historian
- Erica Armstrong Dunbar, professor of history and executive producer of The Gilded Age
- Lloyd Gardner, Mary and Charles Beard Professor of History and distinguished diplomatic historian
- Seth Gopin, art historian and dean of academic affairs, director of Global Studies Programme
- Annette Gordon-Reed, professor of history (Newark), winner of the Pulitzer Prize for History 1999
- Michael Kulikowski, professor of history at the University of Tennessee; author of Late Roman Spain and Its Cities, 2004, and Rome's Gothic Wars from the Third Century to Alaric
- Maurice Lee, Jnr., (1925–2020), Margaret A. Judson Professor of History.
- David Levering Lewis, former professor of history; twice winner of the Pulitzer Prize for Biography or Autobiography (1994 and 2001)
- Tomás Eloy Martínez, professor of Latin American studies; Argentinian journalist and writer
- Marysa Navarro (born 1934), professor of history
- Phillip S. Paludan, professor of history (Camden)
- Said Sheikh Samatar, professor of history (Newark)
- Jacob Soll, professor of history (Camden), MacArthur Fellow 2011
- Traian Stoianovich, professor of history
- Camilla Townsend, professor of history

== Athletic coaches and staff ==
- Dick Anderson, football coach (1984–1989); assistant coach at Lafayette College, University of Pennsylvania and Penn State
- George Case, baseball coach (1950–1960), including 1950 College World Series berth; former Major League Baseball player with the Washington Senators and the Cleveland Indians; four-time All-Star and six-time American League leader in stolen bases
- Lev Kirshner, soccer player and soccer coach
- Robert E. Mulcahy, athletic director
- Stephen Peterson, men's rowing coach (1992–1995)
- Mike Rice Jr., men's basketball coach (2010–2013)
- Leon Rose, assistant men's basketball coach, Camden campus (1986–1988); president of the New York Knicks
- George Sanford, football coach (1913–1923)
- Greg Schiano, football coach (2001–2011, since 2020)
- Terry Shea, football coach (1996–2000); later a coach with the Kansas City Chiefs, the Chicago Bears, the Miami Dolphins, and the St. Louis Rams
- C. Vivian Stringer
- Dick Vitale, assistant basketball coach (1970–1972); coach of the Detroit Pistons; sports commentator

== Fictional characters ==
- Jackie Aprile, Jr., The Sopranos
- Jason Gervasi, The Sopranos (Newark)
- Harriet Hayes, Studio 60 on the Sunset Strip
- Mr. Magoo, 1950s cartoon character
- Jason Parisi, The Sopranos (Newark)
- Lucy McClane, Die Hard franchise (Camden)

== Notes and references ==
=== Online resources ===
- Rutgers notable alumni
- Rutgers Business School distinguished alumni
- Scarlet Knights History Hall of Fame
