= Bartha =

Bartha is a Hungarian name. People with the name include:

== Given name ==
- Bartha Knoppers (born 1951), Canadian lawyer
- Bartha van Crimpen (1754–1818), Dutch patriot

== Surname ==
- Albert Bartha (1877–1960), Hungarian military officer and politician
- Andrea Bartha, Hungarian visual artist, set and costume designer
- Aranka Szabó-Bartha (1926–2018), Hungarian sprinter
- Ferenc Bartha (1943–2012), Hungarian economist
- Zoltán Sulkowsky and Gyula Bartha (born c. 1904–1905), Hungarian long-distance motorcycle riders
- John Bartha (1915–1991), Hungarian film actor
- Justin Bartha (born 1978), American actor
- Károly Bartha (1884–1964), Hungarian military officer and politician
- Károly Bartha (swimmer) (1907–1991), Hungarian swimmer
- László Bartha (disambiguation), multiple people
- Rezső von Bartha (1912–2001), Hungarian fencer and modern pentathlete
- Richard Bartha, Hungarian-born American microbiologist

== See also ==
- Baingan bharta
