= Uhrich =

Uhrich is a surname. Notable people with the surname include:

- Andy Uhrich, American mixed martial artist
- Jean-Jacques Uhrich (1802–1886), French general
- John Michael Uhrich (1877–1951), Canadian politician
- Kathryn Uhrich (born 1965), American chemical engineer
- Gregory John Uhrich (born 1970), former US Navy Seabee Construction Mechanic: Staff Sergeant US Army retired

== See also ==
- Ulrich
