= Bill Pickel =

American football player (born 1959)

No. 71
- Positions: Defensive tackle, defensive end

Personal information
- Born: November 5, 1959 (age 67); New York, New York, U.S.
- Listed height: 6 ft 5 in (1.96 m)
- Listed weight: 265 lb (120 kg)

Career information
- High school: St. Francis (Brooklyn, New York)
- College: Rutgers (1979–1982)
- NFL draft: 1983: 2nd round, 54th overall pick

Career history
- Los Angeles Raiders (1983–1990); New York Jets (1991–1994)

Awards and highlights
- Super Bowl champion (XVIII); First-team All-Pro (1986); PFWA All-Rookie Team (1983)

Career NFL statistics
- Tackles: 576
- Sacks: 56
- Fumble recoveries: 11
- Stats at Pro Football Reference

William George Pickel (born November 5, 1959) is an American former professional football player who was a defensive tackle for 12 seasons in the National Football League (NFL) with the Los Angeles Raiders from 1983 to 1990 and New York Jets from 1991 to 1994. Pickel attended St. Francis Prep. He played college football for the Rutgers Scarlet Knights. As a second-round draft pick of the Raiders in 1983, Pickel overcame injuries to win a Super Bowl as a rookie, and was a sack threat during the early part of his career with the Raiders, making the 1985 All-Pro team. He is currently 98th in career sacks with 56. A standout player, Pickel played nearly every Raider defensive snap in 1984 and 1985. He had a distinctive 4-point stance, placing two hands down instead of the usual one, as was the case with other quick defensive tackles such as Bob Lilly and Tom Keating.

Pickel guest starred in a 1994 episode of Home Improvement. He is noted for his volunteer work with the Joshua Frase Foundation, a non-profit group that supports research for centronuclear myopathy.

== See also ==
- List of Rutgers University people
