= Michel Kahaleh =

American gastroenterologist

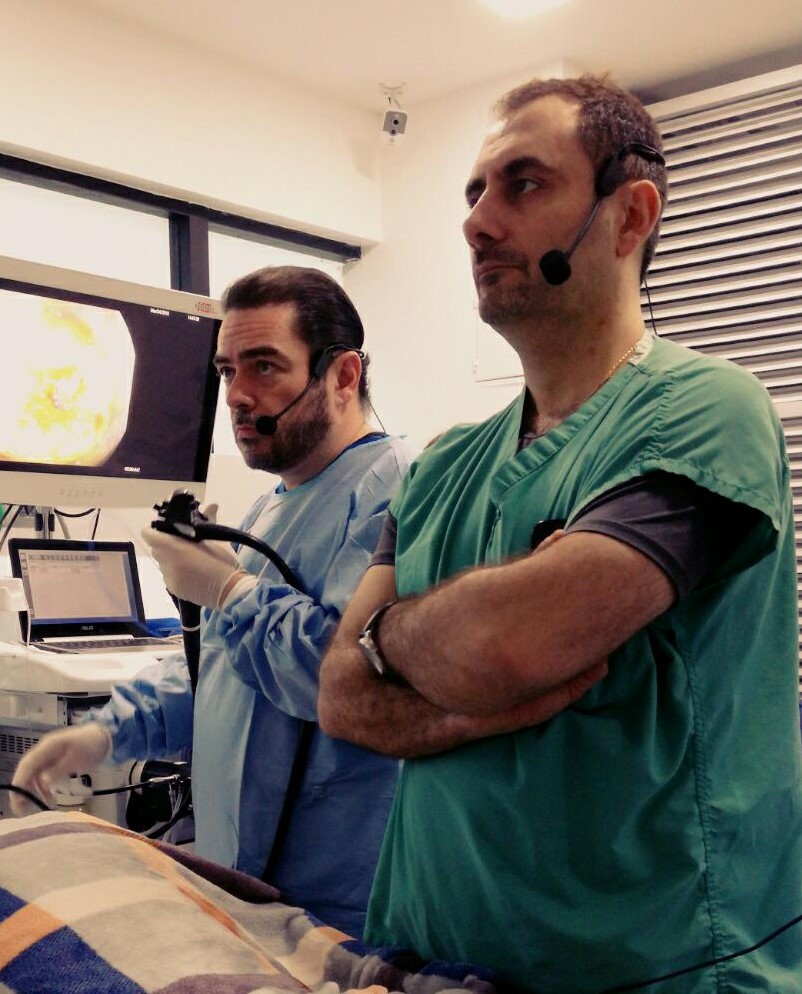
Kahaleh overseeing an Endoscopy during a live course workshop in 2017

Michel Kahaleh is an American gastroenterologist and an expert in therapeutic endoscopy.

He is a Professor of Medicine, and is currently the Clinical Director of Gastroenterology, Chief of Endoscopy, and Director of the Pancreas Program at the Department of Medicine, Robert Wood Johnson Medical School, Rutgers, The State University of New Jersey. He is the Founder and Director of the Therapeutic Endoscopic Ultrasound Society. He is the Founder and CEO of the non-profit organization Innovative Digestive Health Education & Research Inc. (IDHER) since 2018 He is also the Founder and CEO of the non-profit organization Foundation for Interventional and Therapeutic Endoscopy (FITE) since 2020

== Medical and research career ==
Trained at Erasmus Hospital, University of Brussels, by Michel Cremer and Jacques Deviere, he became the leader of the Pancreatico-Biliary group at the University of Virginia before joining Weill Cornell Medical College as the Chief of Endoscopy and Pancreas Program Director in July 2011. In January 2018, Kahaleh joined Rutgers Robert Wood Johnson University as clinical director of gastroenterology and chief of endoscopy. Kahaleh's research is focused on interventional endoscopy, and the use of new devices to diagnose and treat various gastrointestinal disorders.

Kahaleh has conducted 30 clinical research studies since 15 years and published 320 papers and 200 national and international scientific presentations.

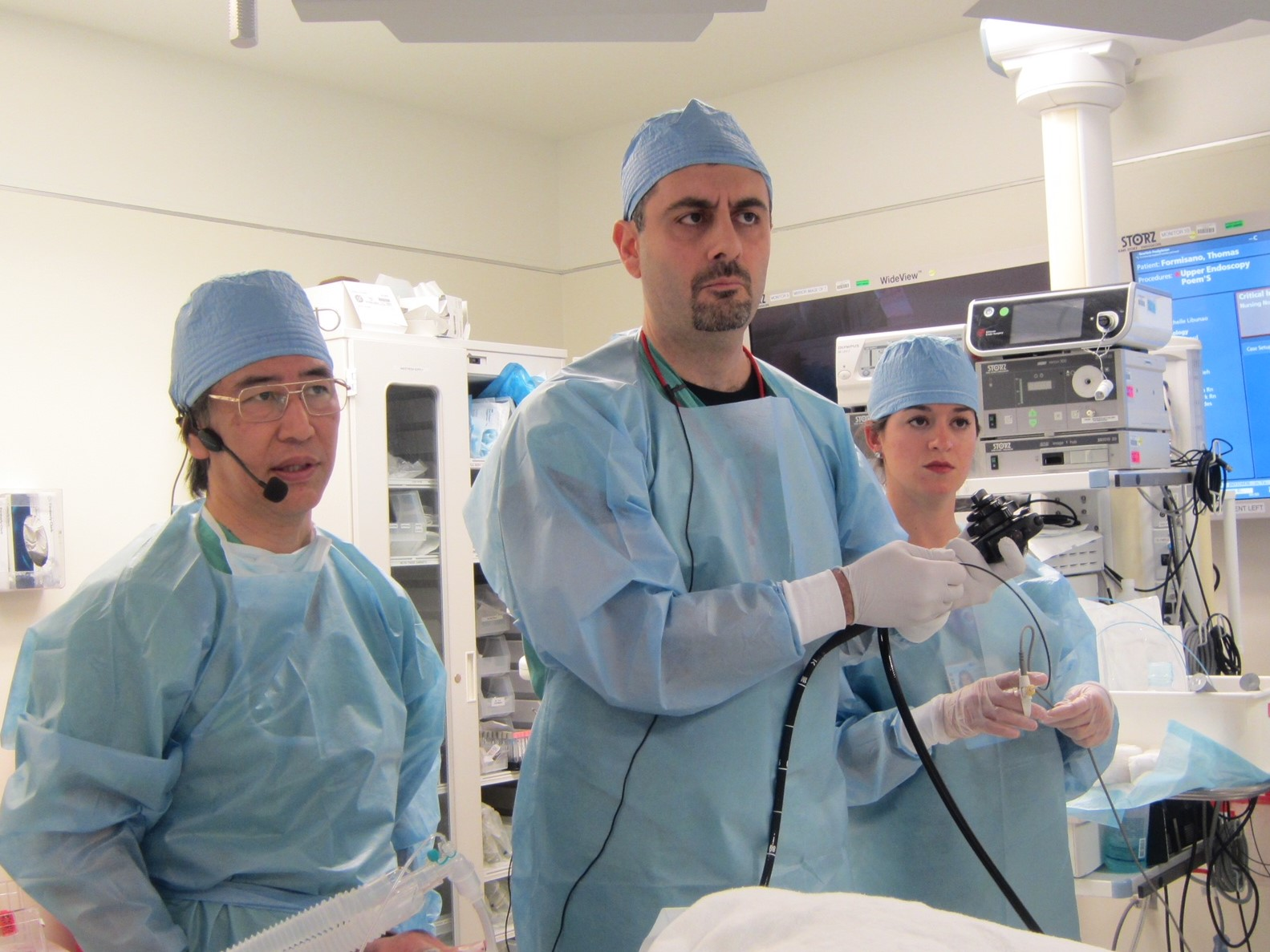
Kahaleh doing Per-oral endoscopic myotomy with Dr. Haruhiro inoue

Kahaleh has been involved in in-vivo projects aiming at improving minimally invasive procedures such as per-oral endoscopic myotomy (POEM) for achalasia, gallbladder drainage, biliary and pancreatic decompression. He is credited with creating a new endoscopic approach for biliary obstructions in altered anatomy patients called EUS-directed transgastric endoscopic retrograde cholangiopancreatography (EDGE).

He helped develop and validate new diagnostic criteria for improving accuracy in diagnosis of bile duct cancer using confocal laser endomicroscopy called the Paris classification. He led a team of expert endoscopists to develop and validate the Monaco classification diagnostic criteria for bile duct cancer using the SpyGlass® Direct Visualization System for cholangioscopy.

Kahaleh was one of the first to publish on radio frequency ablation (RFA) for bile duct cancer and pancreatic cancer therapy using Nagy Habib's probe in the United States. He was the first to publish a clinical trial on photodynamic therapy (PDT) in the United States for bile duct cancer. He was the first to conduct a pre-clinical study of a radio frequency ablation probe using endoscopic ultrasound (EUS-RFA) meant for treating pancreatic cancer. The EUS-RFA probe was created by Nagy Habib and has been successfully used in humans after the pre-clinical study.

Kahaleh has further published papers on additional minimally invasive endoscopic treatment for several conditions including pancreatic fluid collections, gastroparesis, gastric outlet obstruction, obesity weight loss procedures, esophageal tumors and others.

Kahaleh has created a personalized training program which allowed him to train physicians on endoscopic submucosal dissection (ESD) and POEM in the US, Italy, Spain, Colombia, Nicaragua, Ecuador, Mexico and Argentina.

== Non-profit Career ==
Dr. Kahaleh is the Founder and Director of the Therapeutic Endoscopic Ultrasound Society. He is the Founder and CEO of the non-profit organization Innovative Digestive Health Education & Research Inc. (IDHER) since 2018 He is also the Founder and CEO of the non-profit organization Foundation for Interventional and Therapeutic Endoscopy (FITE) since 2020

As the Founder of the Therapeutic Endoscopic Ultrasound Society, along with colleague co-founder Todd Baron, Kahaleh and Monica Gaidhane have hosted the annual consortium on Therapeutic EUS during the Digestive Disease Week for the past 9 years.

As the Founder of the Innovative Digestive Health Education & Research Inc. (IDHER), along with co-founder Monica Gaidhane, Kahaleh has directed many continuing medical education conferences for Advanced Endoscopy including the annual Mid-Atlantic Gastrointestinal Interventional Course (MAGIC), annual Mid-Atlantic Bariatric Endoscopy Course (MALBEC) and annual Emerging Pancreatic Innovations Course (EPIC) for the past 4 years.

Dr. Kahaleh helped develop the Foundation for Interventional and Therapeutic Endoscopy (FITE) to fulfill unmet needs of Interventional and Therapeutic Endoscopists.

All three of his non-profit organizations focus on education, practice, research and improving patient outcomes with minimally invasive treatments.

== Honors and awards ==
- Fellow - 2007, Awarded By: American College of Gastroenterology
- Fellow - 2007, Awarded By: American Society for Gastrointestinal Endoscopy
- Video Plenary Session Award - 2016, Awarded by American Society for Gastrointestinal Endoscopy
- Fellow - 2018, Awarded By: New York Society of Gastrointestinal Endoscopy
