= László Bartha =

László Bartha is the name of:

- László Bartha (athlete, born 1925) (1925–1982), Hungarian sprinter
- László Bartha (footballer) (born 1987), Hungarian footballer
