= Lev Susany =

Australian powerlifter

Big Lev Susany
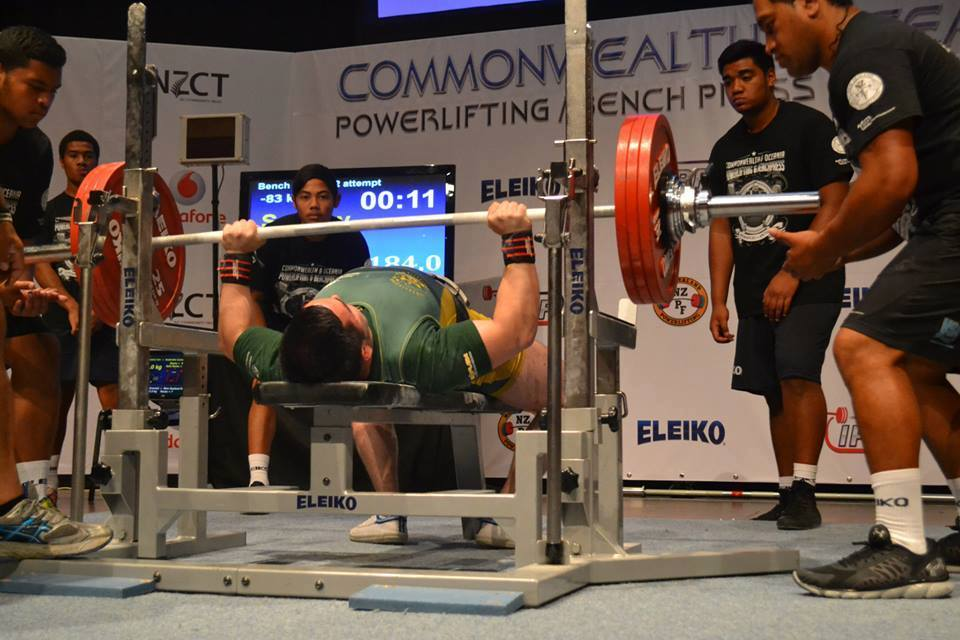
- Lev's gold medal bench press of 184 kg at the 2013 Commonwealth & Oceania Powerlifting Championships

Personal information
- Nationality: Australia
- Born: 19 November 1988 (age 37) Brisbane, Australia
- Height: 5 ft 9 in (1.75 m)
- Weight: 85 kg (187 lb)

Sport
- Sport: Powerlifting

Lev Susany
Medal record

Representing Australia

Men's powerlifting
Silver medal – second place	2014 Asia & Oceania Championships	93 kg division
Gold medal – first place	2013 Commonwealth Championships	83 kg division
Gold medal – first place	2013 Oceania Championships	83 kg division
Gold medal – first place	2012 Oceania Championships	83 kg division
Gold medal – first place	2011 Commonwealth Championships	74 kg division
Gold medal – first place	2010 Oceania Championships	75 kg division
Gold medal – first place	2010 National Championships	75 kg division

Lev Susany (born 19 November 1988) is a former Australian powerlifter who competed in the International Powerlifting Federation (IPF). He was a member of the Australian Powerlifting Team for 5 years, from 2010 to 2014. He has won numerous Australian, Oceania and Commonwealth Powerlifting Championships over three weight classes (74 kg, 83 kg and 93 kg).

In 2011, Susany was the No. 1 ranked raw junior powerlifter in the world in the men's 74 kg division, and also had the No. 1 ranked bench press in the world. In 2012 and 2013, Susany was the No. 3 ranked raw bench press lifter in the world in the men's 83 kg division. Susany holds numerous National, Oceania and Commonwealth records, and has the highest recorded bench press in his weight division at National, Oceania and Commonwealth level. As of 2015, Susany has broken a total of 33 powerlifting records (7 Commonwealth, 10 Oceania and 16 Australian records) over three weight classes (74 kg, 83 kg and 93 kg). He has been awarded Sportsman of the Year at both The University of Queensland and Queensland University of Technology, as well as a Full Blue Award at The University of Queensland.

== Rankings ==
=== 2014 ===
- #4 World IPF Bench Press Ranking – Open Men's 93 kg division

=== 2013 ===
- #3 World IPF Bench Press Ranking – Open Men's 83 kg division

=== 2012 ===
- #3 World IPF Bench Press Ranking – Open Men's 83 kg division

=== 2011 ===
- #1 World IPF Powerlifting Ranking – Junior Men's 74 kg division
- #1 World IPF Bench Press Ranking – Junior Men's 74 kg division
- #1 World IPF Bench Press Ranking – Open Men's 74 kg division

== Raw powerlifting records ==
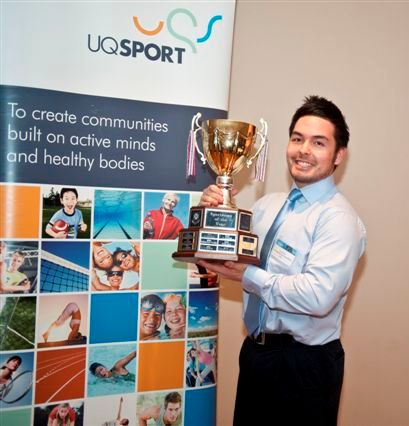
Lev with the 2012 UQ Sportsman of the Year Trophy

Record Type	Age Division	Weight Class	Weight	Date	Event
Australian	Junior	74 kg division	172.5 kg squat	16 October 2011	SE QLD Autumn Challenge
Australian	Junior & Open	74 kg division	155.5 kg bench press	16 December 2011	Commonwealth Powerlifting Championships
Australian	Junior	83 kg division	160 kg bench press	27 November 2011	SE QLD Challenge
Australian	Open	83 kg division	184 kg bench press	5 December 2013	Commonwealth and Oceania Powerlifting and Bench Press Championships
Australian	Open	93 kg division	195.5 kg bench press	3 May 2014	University of Queensland Challenge
Australian	Junior	74 kg division	235 kg deadlift	16 October 2011	SE QLD Autumn Challenge
Australian	Junior	74 kg division	555 kg total	16 October 2011	SE QLD Autumn Challenge
Oceania	Junior & Open	74 kg division	155.5 kg bench press	16 December 2011	Commonwealth Powerlifting Championships
Oceania	Junior & Open	74 kg division	155.5 kg bench press only	16 December 2011	Commonwealth Powerlifting Championships
Oceania	Open	83 kg division	184 kg bench press only	5 December 2013	Commonwealth and Oceania Powerlifting and Bench Press Championships
Oceania	Open	93 kg division	193 kg bench press	9 December 2014	Asia & Oceania Powerlifting & Bench Press Championships
Commonwealth	Junior & Open	74 kg division	155.5 kg bench press	16 December 2011	Commonwealth Powerlifting Championships
Commonwealth	Junior	74 kg division	155.5 kg bench press only	16 December 2011	Commonwealth Powerlifting Championships
Commonwealth	Open	83 kg division	184 kg bench press only	5 December 2013	Commonwealth and Oceania Powerlifting and Bench Press Championships
Commonwealth	Open	93 kg division	193 kg bench press	9 December 2014	Asia & Oceania Powerlifting & Bench Press Championships
