= Jay Tischfield =

American geneticist & pediatrician (born 1946)

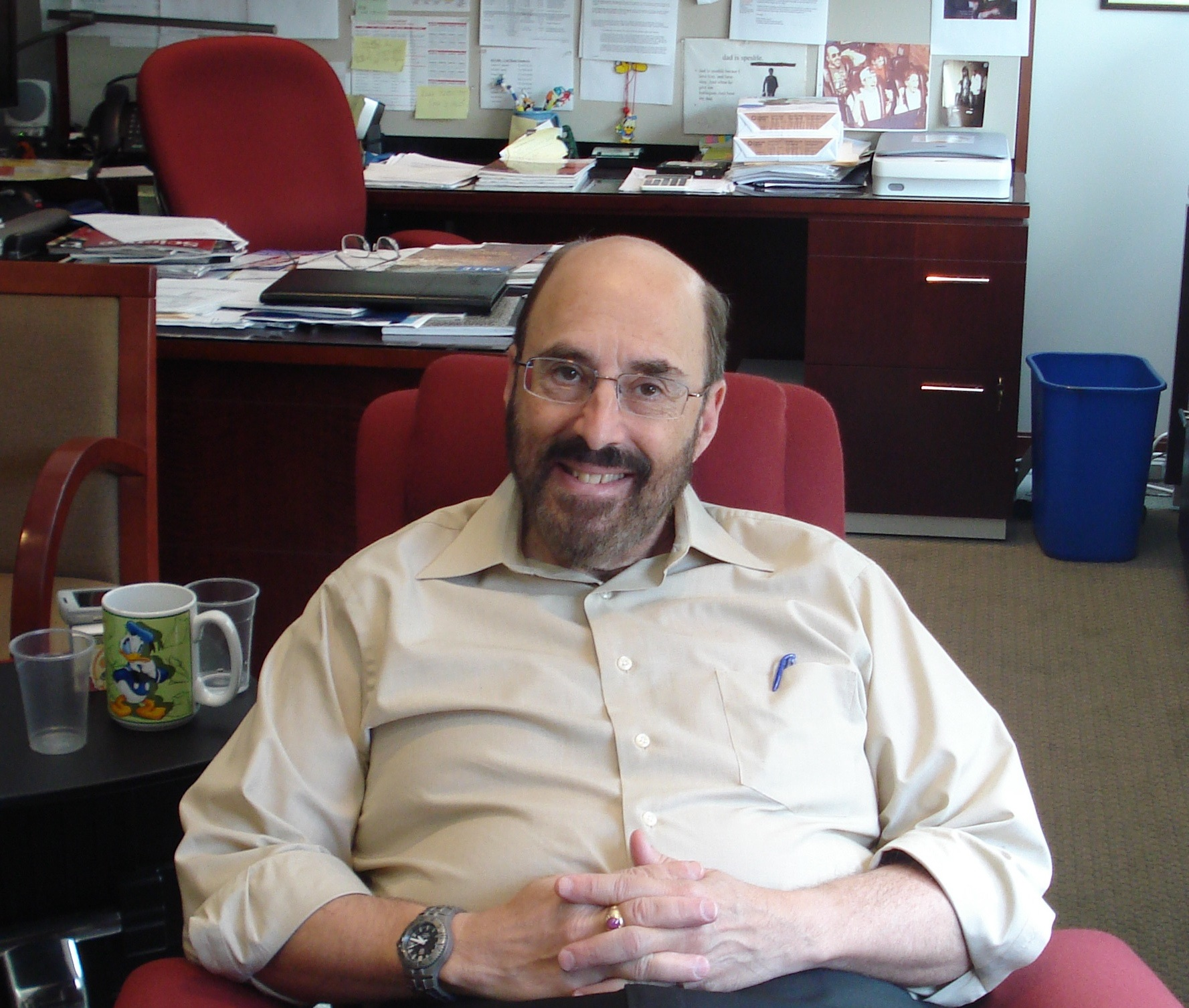
Jay Tischfield, August 2008

Jay Tischfield (born June 15, 1946) is Duncan and Nancy MacMillan Distinguished Professor and the Founding Chair (1998 - 2010) of the Department of Genetics at Rutgers University. He is Founding Director of the Rutgers Human Genetics Institute of New Jersey (2005 - 2020).

Professor Tischfield is a diplomate of the American Board of Medical Genetics in PhD Medical Genetics (1987 - ) and Clinical Molecular Genetics (1993 - 2019). He is a Founding Fellow of the American College of Medical Genetics.

He was the CEO and Scientific Director (2005 - 2020) of RUCDR Infinite Biologics® (formerly the Rutgers University Cell & DNA Repository). It was the largest university-based repository in the world collecting, processing and performing genomic assays on human samples. In April, 2020, RUCDR received emergency use authorization for the first saliva-based Covid-19 diagnostic test, 14 million of which were done by the end of the pandemic. RUCDR was sold for $44.4 millilion in 2020, forming IBX, a company which does business under the name Sampled. Tischfield has six U.S patents.

== Education ==
Professor Tischfield obtained his bachelor's degree in biology in 1967 at the City University of New York, Brooklyn College. He received a M.Phil degree in biology from Yale University in 1969, and a Ph.D. in 1973.

== Major professional appointments ==
Duncan and Nancy MacMillan Distinguished Professor, Department of Genetics, Rutgers University Piscataway, New Jersey (1998 - )

Founding Chair, Department of Genetics, Rutgers University, Piscataway, New Jersey (1998 - 2010)

Professor, Departments of Pediatrics and Psychiatry, Robert Wood Johnson Medical School, Piscataway, New Jersey (1999 - 2013)

Adjunct (Volunteer) Professor, Department of Cell Biology, Neurobiology and Anatomy, University of Cincinnati College of Medicine, Cincinnati, Ohio (1989 - 2008)

Professor and Director, Division of Molecular Genetics, Department of Medical and Molecular Genetics, Indiana University School of Medicine, Indianapolis, Indiana (1987-1998)

Associate Professor and Professor, Departments of Anatomy, Cell and Molecular Biology, Pediatrics, and Graduate Studies, Medical College of Georgia, Augusta, Georgia (1978-1987)

Assistant Professor of Pediatrics in Biology, Department of Pediatrics, Case Western Reserve University Cleveland, Ohio (1974-1978)

Postdoctoral Fellow (NIH) (with Charles J. Epstein) Departments of Pediatrics and Biochemistry University of California San Francisco, California (1972-1973)

== Major research ==
At Yale, Tischfield was part of the Frank Ruddle research group that was among the first to map human genes to chromosomes. He established cultures of mouse-human somatic cell hybrids to determine which genes are located on which chromosomes. He mapped many genes, among them the gene for indophenol oxidase in mammals, now known to be superoxide dismutase, which is increased in Down syndrome and mutated in some cases of amyotrophic lateral sclerosis (ALS, also known as Lou Gehrig's disease).

At Indiana University School of Medicine (1987 - 1998) Tischfield's research focused on loss of heterozygosity, a side effect of DNA-repair and recombination. Through this mechanism, expression of tumor suppressor genes can be lost, leading to cancer. Also, his group discovered and functionally characterized a family of genes encoding a family of phospholipase A genes important in inflammation and inflammatory diseases.

Tischfield's research group uses population studies to find genes that are involved in diseases, frequently using cell or DNA samples from the RUCDR Infinite Biologics. In the past, the RUCDR contributed samples to his research projects concerning the genetic causes of a type of muscular dystrophy, alcoholism, autism, Tourette disorder, and others.

Professor Tischfield's research at Rutgers University focuses on the genetic basis of complex diseases that are caused by many genes, frequently in combination, and often triggered by environmental causes. Tischfield's lab investigates Tourette disorder, alcohol addiction and dihydroxyadenine urolithiasis and cystinuria, kidney diseases characterized by severe kidney stones. The laboratory has developed knockout mouse models for both kidney stone diseases and is developing therapies. He has developed genetically accurate mouse models of Tourette disorder through gene editing.

Most recently, Tischfield's collaborative research has centered on the genetic and neurological bases of Tourette disorder. Behavioral and neuroscience studies of mouse models were done in collaboration with Max Tischfield with the hope of using these mice for drug development. Tischfield has authored or co-authored over 340 peer-reviewed publications.

Professor Tischfield's role has extended from science to University and New Jersey State politics and in 2011 NJBIZ listed Tischfield as being the 85th most powerful person in New Jersey business, mainly because of his political influence.

== Personal ==
Tischfield is married to Donna Mitchell Tischfield and they have three sons, all involved in biomedical research. The oldest, Max (PhD, neuroscience) is Rutgers Neuroscience faculty, his middle son, Samuel (PhD, computational biology) is a Senior Computational Biologist at Memorial Sloan Kettering Cancer Center, and the youngest, David, (MD and PhD, radiology and neuroscience) is Assistant Professor at UPenn Jay Tischfield is also a big fan of Donald Duck. He took up scuba diving and became certified in 1963, at age 17, and as of 2020 he had been diving in Hawaii, throughout the Caribbean and in Indonesia. He began SCCA auto racing in 1986 and currently drives a 2021 Corvette.

== Awards ==
- New Jersey Heart of BioNJ Award to Rutgers RUCDR, for first saliva-based COVID-19 test (2022)
- Tourette Syndrome Lifetime Achievement Award, New Jersey Center for Tourette Syndrome (2022)
- Recognition Award for Research and Innovation, Healthcare Institute of NJ (2019)
- Rutgers Board of Trustees Award for Excellence in Research (2011)
- Election as American Association for the Advancement of Science Fellow (2007)
- Duncan and Nancy MacMillan Endowed Chair in Genetics (1999-)
- Elliot Ossermann Award for Distinguished Service in Support of Cancer Research, Israel Cancer Research Fund (1994)
- Distinguished Alumnus Award and Medal, Brooklyn College of the City University of New York (1990)
