= Panos G. Georgopoulos =

Greek scientist

Panos G. Georgopoulos (born 1957) is a Greek-American environmental scientist and professor. He is currently a professor of environmental science at Rutgers University and Robert Wood Johnson Medical School. Georgopoulos is known for being the architect of the MOdeling ENvironment for Total Risk studies (MENTOR), the DOse Response Information and Analysis system (DORIAN), and Prioritization/Ranking of Toxic Exposures with GIS Extension (PRoTEGE), all under continuing development at the Computational Chemodynamics Laboratory of the Rutgers Environmental and Occupational Health Sciences Institute (EOHSI).

== Education ==
Georgopoulos received a diploma in Chemical Engineering from the National Technical University of Athens in 1980. He then attended the California Institute of Technology, earning a Masters of Science in 1982 and a PhD in 1986.

== Professional career ==
Georgopoulos has been a faculty member at Rutgers University since 1989. His primary appointment is to the Robert Wood Johnson Medical School. He has held teaching positions in the department of environmental sciences, the department of chemical and biochemical engineering, and the department of environmental and occupational health. He is also a member of the Environmental and Occupational Health Sciences Institute in Piscataway, New Jersey, and has served as director of the institute's occupational chemodynamics laboratory and its ozone research center. He has also served as director for the Informatics and Computational Toxicology Core of the NIEHS Center for Environmental Exposures and Disease at EOHSI, and is an associate member of the Rutgers Cancer Institute. In 2010, he became co-director of the Environmental Bioinformatics and Computational Toxicology Center, a Rutgers - Princeton - USFDA Research Consortium.

Georgopoulos served as the associate editor of the Journal of the Air and Waste Management Association from 1995 to 2001. In 2012 he was awarded the USEPA Scientific and Technological Achievement Award (2012) for Probabilistic Exposure Modeling for Arsenic and Methyl Mercury to Inform Regulatory and Community Decision Making.

Georgopoulos was a contributor to the fifth National Climate Assessment and the NIEHS post 9/11 environmental review of the World Trade Center site.

== Selected publications ==
- Landrigan P.J., Lioy P.J., Thurston G., Berkowitz G., Chen L.C., Chillrud S.N., Gavett S.H., Georgopoulos P.G., Geyh A.S., Levin S., Perera F., Rappaport S.M. and Small C. (2004). Health and environmental consequences of the World Trade Center disaster. Environmental Health Perspectives 112 (6): 731–739. doi:10.1289/ehp.6702
- Li G., Hu J., Wang S.W., Georgopoulos P.G., Schoendorf J. and Rabitz H. (2006). Random Sampling-High Dimensional Model Representation (RS-HDMR) and orthogonality of its different order component functions. Journal of Physical Chemistry A 110 (7): 2474–2485. doi:10.1021/jp054148m
- Broday D. and Georgopoulos P.G. (2001). Growth and deposition of hygroscopic particulate matter in the human lungs. Aerosol Science and Technology 34: 144–159. doi:10.1080/02786820118725
- Georgopoulos P.G., Wang S.W., Vyas V.M., Sun Q., Burke J., Vedantham R., McCurdy T. and Ozkaynak H. (2005). A source-to-dose assessment of population exposures to fine PM and ozone in Philadelphia, PA, during a summer 1999 episode. Journal of Exposure Analysis and Environmental Epidemiology 15 (5): 439−457. doi:10.1038/sj.jea.7500422
- Balakrishnan S., Roy A., Ierapetritou M.G., Flach G.P. and Georgopoulos P.G. (2003). Uncertainty reduction and characterization for complex environmental fate and transport models: An empirical Bayesian framework incorporating the stochastic response surface method. Water Resources Research 39 (12): 1350. doi:10.1029/2002WR001810
- Georgopoulos P.G., Wang S.W., Vyas V.M., Sun Q., Burke J., Vedantham R., McCurdy T. and Ozkaynak H. (2005). A source-to-dose assessment of population exposures to fine PM and ozone in Philadelphia, PA, during a summer 1999 episode. Journal of Exposure Analysis and Environmental Epidemiology 15 (5): 439−457. doi:10.1038/sj.jea.7500422
- Georgopoulos P.G., Roy A., Yonone-Lioy M.J., Opiekun R.E. and Lioy P.J. (2002). Environmental Dynamics and Human Exposure to Copper Volume 1: Environmental Dynamics and Human Exposure Issues. New York, NY, International Copper Association. OCLC 501185152, Environmental Dynamics and Human Exposure to Copper at Google Books
- Georgopoulos P.G., Wang S.W., Vyas V.M., Lioy P.J., Tan H.C., Georgopoulos I.G. and Yonnone-Lioy J. (2002). Environmental Dynamics and Human Exposure to Copper Volume 2: Framework and Data Sources for Assessing Human Exposure to Copper in the United States. New York, NY, International Copper Association. OCLC 501185152, Environmental Dynamics and Human Exposure to Copper at Google Books
