= Seth Gopin =

American art historian

Dr. Seth Gopin was the Director of Global Programs at Rutgers University. He has also been a professor of Art History there. He has received the French award of Chevalier in the Order of the Academic Palm.

== Works ==
- Jean Baptiste Vanmour (1671-1737), Peintre de la Sublime Porte (2009) with Eveline Sint Nicolaas
- Skyscrapers of New York (2012)
