= Morayo Afolabi-Brown =

Nigerian TV host (born 1980)

- Born: 6 July 1980 (age 46); Lagos, Nigeria
- Education: Rutgers University
- Occupation: Television presenter
- Employer: TVC
- Spouse: Femi Afolabi-Brown (m. 2011)
- Children: 4
- Parents: Alao Aka-Bashorun (father); Kudirat Atinuke Aka-Bashorun (mother)
- Website: www.youtube.com/@morayoafolabibrownoffcial

Morayo Afolabi-Brown (née Aka-Bashorun; born 6 July 1980) is a Nigerian television host and the managing director of TVC Entertainment Channel.

She was the deputy director of programmes at TVC News and the host of its breakfast show, Your View, inspired by the American talk show The View.

== Early life and education ==
Afolabi-Brown was born Morayo Aka-Bashorun and is the only daughter of Alao Aka-Bashorun, former president of the Nigerian Bar Association. She studied political science at Rutgers University and graduated in 2002. Growing up, she was influenced by her mother and by the books and speeches of Abike Dabiri, Ngozi Okonjo-Iweala, Ibukun Awosika, Oprah Winfrey, and Chimamanda Ngozi Adichie. After about 10 years abroad, she returned to Nigeria in 2004.

== Career ==
Afolabi-Brown began her career in the media in 2005 as a client service manager at CMC Connect, a public relations company. She later moved to CUE Media, a content development company as the head of content and development, and later became a senior executive, marketing and research. She is behind many concepts including Girlfriends (TV drama series), Changing Lives (Talk Show), and Shop Easy. She once worked as a business development manager and later became head of content and channels acquisition at HiTV, Nigeria's first indigenous cable station provider, before she was hired as deputy director of programmes at TVC.

In June 2023, Afolabi-Brown launched her book titled Becoming The Queen of Talk TV, and celebrated 10 years as a broadcaster.

In December 2023, she was appointed managing director of TVC Entertainment Channel under TVC Communications.

In a video posted on her Instagram page on Friday, Afolabi-Brown confirmed she would step down as host of the daily talk show and also leave her role as MD, with August 29 set as her final day on air.

On December 16, 2025, Morayo Afolabi-Brown announced the launch of a new daily live talk programme, The Morayo Show, marking a significant new phase in her broadcasting career following her exit from TVC Communications.

== Recognition ==
In 2020, Afolabi-Brown was ranked 18th among the 25 most powerful women in journalism in Nigeria in a list compiled by Women in Journalism Africa.

== Personal life ==
Afolabi-Brown married lawyer Femi Afolabi-Brown in February 2011. They have four children: a daughter (born 2012), twins, a daughter and a son (born 2014), and a son (born 2019).
