= Andrea Bartha =

Hungarian set and costume designer

Andrea Bartha is a Hungarian set designer, costume designer, and visual artist.

== Biography ==
Andrea Bartha was born in Budapest, Hungary. She studied painting and art history at the University of Costa Rica, San José. By this time she worked for the Teatro Nacional de Costa Rica, first as a scenic artist, then later as a designer. Continuing her studies in Budapest at the ELTE University, Faculty of Human Sciences, she graduated in History and Philosophy of Art, then carried on postgraduate studies in the subject of History and Theory of Theater. She published articles related to visuality on theater and stage. Her book, Theater Design at the Turn of the Century was published by the Hungarian Theater Institute (OSZMI) in 1990.

In line with her theoretical work, Bartha got involved in underground theater, dance-theater, rock-scene and multimedia experiments, cooperating as actor, dancer, designer and artist with various Hungarian and foreign groups. As one of the founders of the Pankrator Balett Action Group, she created art performances and happenings in the turn of the 80s and 90s.

Bartha has worked as a theater designer since 1991, having been credited in more than 100 productions in Hungary and abroad (Czech Republic, Denmark, Philippines, Slovakia, Sweden, UK). bartha has been awarded the Prize for Best Costumes (POSZT) for Leonce and Lena (1991), the Hungarian Theater Critics Award (Színikritikusok Díja) for Das Käthchen von Heilbronn (1993), Tales from the Vienna Woods (1994), The Seagull (1996), The Italian Straw Hat (1997) respectively, the Slovak Critics Dosky Awards for Best Costumes, II. for Best Sets for The Three Sisters, and has got many nominations both in Hungary and other countries. Bartha is critically praised for her many updating innovative designs made for Shakespeare, Chekhov, and musical performances. She has made non-replica costumes for several different Miss Saigon productions around the world (Denmark, Sweden, Philippines, Hungary). Frank Wildhorn choose her to design the sets and costumes for the world-opening of his new musical on Carmen which opened in Prague in 2008, which was also produced by Andrea's Hungarian costume and set company. Carmen is scheduled to have an opening in Broadway. In 2009, Bartha made an individual version for "Spring Awakening", opening in Budapest. In 2010, she designed and produced costumes for the family musical Sommernachtstraum, in Vienna. In 2013, Carmen debuted in Asia.

She has taken part in different group exhibitions, and in 2004 had an individual exhibition as a designer titled "De/Signs".

Bartha also creates paintings and artworks and takes part in experimental projects in art exhibitions.

== Notable theatrical works from 1991–2010 ==
=== Prose ===
- The Cherry Orchard Víg Theater Bp 2007
- Romeo and Juliet Új Theater Bp 2006, Szeged National Theater 1999
- Four legged horse... Pesti Theater Bp 2005
- Mary of Stuart Pesti Theater Bp 2005
- 120 days of Marquis De Sade( world opening) Puppet Theater 2005
- Three Sisters Új Theater 2004, Divadlo Andrea Bagara - Nitra 2003
- Comedy of Errors Víg Theater 2004, Prague National Theater 2000
- The Virgin of Orleans Hevesi Sándor Theater Zalaegerszeg 2002
- Shopping and Fucking Thália Studió 2002
- Macbeth Tivoli2001 Víg Theater 1995
- Hamlet Divadlo Andrea Bagara - Nitra 2001
- A Midsummer Nights Dream Szeged National Theater 2001
- The Marriage of Figaro Tivoli Theater 2000
- Much Ado About Nothing Prague National Theater 1999, Víg Theater 1999
- A Streetcar Named Desire Tivoli Theater 1999
- The Tempest Víg Theater 1999
- Bandits Budapest Chamber Theater 1998
- The Merchant of Venice Tivoli Theater 1998
- The Seagull Budapest Chamber Theater 1997
- As You Like It Bratislava National Theater 1996
- Baal Víg Theater 1995
- Tales of the Vienna Woods Pesti Theater 1994
- Katchen von Heilbronn Víg Tent 1993
- Leonce and Lena Budapest Chamber Theater 1991

=== Operas and musicals ===
- Aida (canceled) Hudební Divadlo Karlín Prague (2011)
- A Midsummer Nights Dream (world-opening) Teatro, Wiener Stadthalle 2010
- Spring Awakening (non-replica) West Teatrum/Operetta Theater 2009
- Carmen (world opening) Hudební Divadlo Karlín Prague 2008
- The Gypsy Princess Hudební Divadlo Karlín Prague 2007
- Altar Boys (non-replica) Thália Theater/Operetta Theater 2007
- The Gospel of Mary Margitsziget Open-Air Theater 2006
- Miss Saigon (non-replica) Győr 2004, Manila 2000, Stockholm 1998, Copenhagen 1996
- Attila Margitsziget Open-Air Theater 2004
- Sweet Charity Operetta Studio 2003
- Cabaret Operetta Studio 2002
- The Last Five Scenes (world-opening) Hungarian State Opera 2000
- Italian Straw Hat Víg Theater 1997
- Somewhere in Europe(world-opening) Operetta Theater 1995
- My Fair Lady Békéscsaba Jókai Theater 1993
- West Side Story Víg Theater 1992
