= Jean Ruth Adams =

American entomologist (1928–2004)

- Born: 1928
- Died: July 12, 2004 (aged 75–76); Hyattsville, Maryland, US
- Education: Ph.D. in Entomology in 1962 from Rutgers University, Bachelors degree in Agricultural Research in 1950 from Rutgers University

Jean Ruth Adams (1928–2004) was an American entomologist specializing in electron microscopy of insect pathogens, particularly viruses.

== Notable works ==
- Adams, Jean Ruth (1961). The location and histology of the contact chemoreceptors of the stable fly, Stomoxys calcitrans L. Rutgers University. OCLC 1087154986.. Ph.D. dissertation.
- Adams, Jean Ruth (1992). Insect potpourri: adventures in entomology. Sandhill Crane Press. ISBN 978-1-877743-09-2. OCLC 757682353.
- Adams, Jean Ruth; Bonami, Jean-Robert (2018). Atlas of invertebrate viruses. CRC Press. ISBN 978-1-138-55765-9. OCLC 1108875806.
