= Neepa Maitra =

Theoretical physicist

Neepa T. Maitra
- Born: September 1972 (age 54)
- Education: Harvard University
- Awards: NSF Career Award
- Scientific career
- Workplaces: Hunter College and Rutgers University-Newark
- Website: https://sites.rutgers.edu/maitra-group/

Neepa T. Maitra is a theoretical physicist and was a professor of physics at Hunter College of the City University of New York and the Graduate Center of the City University of New York. She now works as a professor at Rutgers, in the field of theoretical chemical physics. She is most well known for her contributions to theoretical chemistry and chemical physics, especially in the development of accurate functionals in time-dependent density functional theory and correlated electron-ion dynamics.

== Early life and education ==
Maitra was born in September 1972, raised in New Zealand, and completed her bachelor's degree in physics at the University of Otago in 1994. She went on to get her Ph.D. in physics at Harvard Universityin 2000 in the lab of Eric "Rick" Heller and postdoctoral at the University of California, Berkeley, and Rutgers University. Maitra is currently in the Department of Physics at Rutgers University-Newark.

== Research projects and publications ==
Time-dependent density functional theory is an area to investigate the properties of various functionals and has a wide range of implications and applications.

- Maitra, Neepa T. (2016-06-08). "Perspective: Fundamental aspects of time-dependent density functional theory". The Journal of Chemical Physics. 144 (22). Bibcode:2016JChPh.144v0901M. doi:10.1063/1.4953039. ISSN 0021-9606. PMID 27305987.
- Maitra, Neepa T (2017-10-25). "Charge transfer in time-dependent density functional theory". Journal of Physics: Condensed Matter. 29 (42): 423001. arXiv:1707.08054. Bibcode:2017JPCM...29P3001M. doi:10.1088/1361-648X/aa836e. ISSN 0953-8984. PMID 28766507.
- Suzuki, Yasumitsu; Lacombe, Lionel; Watanabe, Kazuyuki; Maitra, Neepa T. (2017-12-27). "Exact Time-Dependent Exchange-Correlation Potential in Electron Scattering Processes". Physical Review Letters. 119 (26) 263401. arXiv:1708.08651. Bibcode:2017PhRvL.119z3401S. doi:10.1103/PhysRevLett.119.263401. PMID 29328727.<
- Lacombe, Lionel; Maitra, Neepa T. (2019-03-12). "Density-Matrix Coupled Time-Dependent Exchange-Correlation Functional Approximations". Journal of Chemical Theory and Computation. 15 (3): 1672–1678. arXiv:1809.07378. doi:10.1021/acs.jctc.8b01159. ISSN 1549-9618. PMID 30689380.

Exact factorization approach is a way to explore numerical stability of equations, and improve understanding of exact potentials and equations.

- Gossel, Graeme H.; Lacombe, Lionel; Maitra, Neepa T. (2019). "On the numerical solution of the exact factorization equations". The Journal of Chemical Physics. 150 (15). arXiv:1901.11216. Bibcode:2019JChPh.150o4112G. doi:10.1063/1.5090802. PMID 31005081.<
- Vindel-Zandbergen, Patricia; Ibele, Lea M.; Ha, Jong-Kwon; Min, Seung Kyu; Curchod, Basile F. E.; Maitra, Neepa T. (2021-07-13). "Study of the Decoherence Correction Derived from the Exact Factorization Approach for Nonadiabatic Dynamics". Journal of Chemical Theory and Computation. 17 (7): 3852–3862. doi:10.1021/acs.jctc.1c00346. ISSN 1549-9618. PMC 8280698. PMID 34138553.

Polaritonic chemistry is a field that arose from manipulating molecules. Maitra's group has been investigating these phenomena through an extension of the exact factorization approach.

- Hoffmann, Norah M.; Lacombe, Lionel; Rubio, Angel; Maitra, Neepa T. (2020). "Effect of many modes on self-polarization and photochemical suppression in cavities". The Journal of Chemical Physics. 153 (10). arXiv:2001.07330. Bibcode:2020JChPh.153j4103H. doi:10.1063/5.0012723. PMID 32933282.
- 'Lacombe, Lionel; Hoffmann, Norah M.; Maitra, Neepa T. (2019-08-22). "Exact Potential Energy Surface for Molecules in Cavities". Physical Review Letters. 123 (8) 083201. arXiv:1906.02651. Bibcode:2019PhRvL.123h3201L. doi:10.1103/PhysRevLett.123.083201. PMID 31491208.

== Presentations ==
At the CECAM workshop on Triggering Out-of-Equilibrium Dynamics in Molecular Systems in Lausanne, Switzerland in March 2023, Maitra participated and gave an invited talk remotely. In August 2023, Maitra presented remotely at the Progress in Non-Equilibrium Green's Function Workshop in Orebro, Sweden discussing recent work on perspectives on TDDFT beyond linear response.

== Awards ==
Maitra received an NSF Career Award for her work in Theoretical and Computational Chemistry.

Maitra received an NSF Award for her work on Molecules in Classical and Quantized Fields.

Maitra was elected a Fellow of the American Physical Society in 2024 for "fundamental contributions to the development of time-dependent density functional theory, identifying rigorous properties of the time-dependent exchange-correlation functional, and seminal work on the correlated motion of electrons and nuclei beyond the Born-Oppenheimer approximation."(From APS)
