= Bartha van Crimpen =

Bartha van Crimpen (1754–1818), was a Dutch patriot. She became a national symbol and impersonated "Freedom" in the inauguration of the first national parliament of the Batavian Republic 3 March 1796.

She was the daughter of Adrianus van Crimpen (1715–1799) and Maria Clasina van Doorschot (d. 1775) and married in 1775 to the official Ary van der Meer (1753–1805). She and her spouse were joint members in the Patriottentijd and leaders of the society ‘Voor ’t Vaderland’ in Haag. The Orangists forced them to flee to France in 1787; they returned in 1795.
