= Stuart Diamond =

American journalist and professor

Professor Stuart Diamond
- Born: June 20, 1948 (age 78); Camden, New Jersey

Stuart Diamond is an American professor, Pulitzer Prize-winning journalist, attorney, entrepreneur, keynote speaker, and author who has taught negotiation for more than 20 years at the University of Pennsylvania's Wharton School of Business. He currently teaches the course at University of Pennsylvania School of Engineering and Applied Science as "Engineering Negotiation" and a Negotiations Course at Penn Law School.

Diamond's widely acclaimed book on negotiation, Getting More, was a 2011 New York Times best-seller and was used by Google to train 12,000 employees worldwide over eight years. The book has sold 2 million copies and has been translated into 27 languages. It was called the #1 book to read for your career by The Wall Street Journal's career site and the best negotiation book "of all time" by Inc. Magazine. The book was named by Amazon as one of 25 leadership and success books to read in one's life. It focuses on perceptions, emotional intelligence and cultural diversity, which, Diamond's research concludes, produces four times as much value as the traditional power, leverage and logic way of negotiating.

Diamond's Getting More negotiation model has been adopted by U.S. Special Operations for the training of U.S. Special Forces, Green Berets, Navy SEALs, U.S. Marines, and other units. Admiral William H. McRaven, Commander of U.S. Special Operations Command (USSOCOM), named Getting More to his recommended reading list for military science.

Diamond's course was the most sought after at the Wharton Business School of UPenn for the 20 years ending in 2016, according to the school's course auction records, and he is now an emeritus professor. He currently teaches the course at the University of Pennsylvania Law School and Engineering Schools, to medical schools, corporations and entrepreneurs, online at www.gettingmore.com or by arrangement with Getting More, Inc.

== Early life and education ==
Diamond was born in Camden, New Jersey, United States on June 20, 1948. His family moved to Nurnberg, Germany when he was 10. He attended Nurnberg American High School and graduated in 1966. Returning to the United States, Diamond attended Rutgers College in New Brunswick, New Jersey, majoring in English and journalism and receiving an AB in 1970. He received his J.D. from Harvard Law School in 1990, and an MBA with honors from Wharton in 1992.

== Career ==
=== Pulitzer Prize ===
Beginning in his junior year at Rutgers, Diamond worked as a reporter for The New Brunswick Daily Home News, and then at Newsday where he covered the Three Mile Island nuclear incident. He then joined The New York Times where he shared a 1987 Pulitzer Prize for his investigation of NASA's culpability in the 1986 Space Shuttle Challenger tragedy. While at The New York Times, Diamond also covered the nuclear accident at Chernobyl and India's Bhopal gas leak. Diamond has won more than 30 other journalism awards, including the Polk Award for national reporting.

=== Investigative journalism ===
Diamond covered energy, environment, technology, politics and many other subjects, and had more than 2,000 articles published under his byline. While at Newsday, he wrote a lengthy series documenting how the Long Island Lighting Company (LILCO) wasted more than $1 billion in the construction of a nuclear plant in Shoreham, New York. This led to a New York State investigation and the removal of this amount for the company's rate base, or the amount on which it can charge customers. This led to the bankruptcy of LILCO and the cancellation of the $5 billion plant.

Diamond spent the last years of his journalism career as an investigative reporter for The New York Times. He covered the Iran-Contra arms scandal and a scandal involving Korea and Deputy White House Chief of Staff Michael Deaver, who was indicted and convicted by Congress of perjury and pardoned by President Ronald Reagan. He also covered the Chernobyl nuclear accident in Ukraine.

=== International negotiation ===
Beginning in 1998, Diamond persuaded approximately 3,000 farmers in the Bolivian jungles of the Chapare region to cease growing cocaine and to grow bananas instead. The bananas have been sold in Argentina and used for Bolivian school lunch programs.

Diamond published his first book, It's In Your Power, in 1980, which focused on the energy crisis and bottom-up solutions. His film documentaries include The Future Is Now, about the technological continuum.

As an entrepreneur, Diamond has headed a cargo airline, a publicly listed technology company, and a medical services company; and served as an executive of a Wall Street energy futures trading company. In 2006, Diamond represented the New York Commodities Exchange in the successful negotiation of electronic trading rights with the New York Mercantile Exchange. In 2008, he provided the process that enabled the Hollywood Writer's Guild to settle their strike with the studios.

Diamond has served as a United Nations consultant, and advised officials in Cuba, China, and former Soviet republics in their transition to independence, including Latvia, Estonia, Lithuania, Belarus, Moldova, Ukraine, Kazakhstan and Uzbekistan. His advice included assisting the prime minister of Latvia and 28 ministers in organizing their first popularly elected government since the Russian Revolution. It also included advising the pharmaceutical sector in Jordan on an international strategy, and the Government of Kuwait in organizing its internal communication after the first Gulf War. It is estimated that Diamond has taught or advised more than 40,000 people in more than 60 countries, from school children to heads of state, on six different continents. Participants in his courses have come from more than 220 of the Fortune 500 companies and more than 25% of the Global 500 companies.

His company, Getting More, Inc., provides training and consulting in negotiation and problem-solving for a diverse international clientele facing internal and external issues. His clients range from the Educational Testing Service in Princeton to a major family-owned conglomerate in Pakistan. He does significant work in the healthcare industry and in advising women how to level the playing field.

=== Teaching ===
Diamond was associate director of the Harvard Negotiation Project and executive director of its outside consulting firm, Conflict Management. In addition to Harvard and UPenn, Diamond has taught at UC Berkeley, Columbia, NYU, Oxford, and University of Southern California. He also teaches at the University of Pennsylvania Law School. In September 2016, he launched two online interactive negotiations courses at www.gettingmore.com. He is a keynote speaker and has spoken at 80 of the Fortune 100 companies.

=== Google ===
Diamond has also served as principal negotiation instructor for Google. His book and model have been chosen to train the company's employees worldwide. He and the team he trained there have taught more than 12,000 employees as of 2015. According to estimates by company employees, the model has brought in several billion dollars for Google.

Diamond is an attorney licensed in New York, New Jersey and Pennsylvania. He specializes in negotiation, mediation and problem-solving.

== Getting More model ==
=== Book ===
Diamond's Getting More model of negotiation focuses on finding and valuing the perceptions and emotions of others, rather than using the traditional tactics of power, logic, and leverage. The subject of his award-winning course at UPenn, the model is also the basis for his third book, Getting More, in which Diamond proposes a new model of human interaction. Praise for Diamond's model has come from quarters as diverse as officials of the National Football League, Morgan Stanley Smith Barney, Psychology Today, Dell Computers, New York Presbyterian Hospital (the largest hospital system in the U.S.) and Google.

Getting More has been called "phenomenal" by Lawyer's Weekly. In 2011, WSJ's FINS Blog called it the "#1 book to read for your career." The book has sold 2 million copies in several dozen countries. Inc. Magazine, a major magazine for entrepreneurs, has said Getting More is the best negotiation book of all time.

Diamond's negotiation course has been the most popular in Wharton's MBA program according to course auction records; he has won the Excellence in Teaching Award 7 times.

=== Special Forces ===
Diamond's Getting More negotiation model has also been adopted by U.S. Special Operations for the training of U.S. Special Forces, Green Berets, Navy SEALs, U.S. Marines and other units. Admiral William H. McRaven, Commander of U.S. Special Operations Command (USSOCOM), named Getting More to his recommended reading list for military science for 2014, and one of only two books on military tradecraft. Diamond has trained more than 5,000 Special Ops soldiers, regular military units, and various Pentagon units. "This… saves lives," according to a plaque given to Professor Diamond by USSOCOM.

Diamond's current research efforts include cultural diversity, the reduction of conflict and more effective methods of human interaction.
