= Nicolas Nuvan =

Colombian-born American social media influencer

- Born: 1994 or 1995 (age 31–32); Colombia
- Education: Rutgers University
- Occupation: Social media influencer

Instagram information
- Page: nicolasnuvan
- Followers: 1 million

TikTok information
- Page: Nicolas Nuvan
- Years active: 2021–present
- Followers: 2.6 million

YouTube information
- Channel: Nicolas Nuvan
- Years active: 2022–present
- Subscribers: 220 thousand
- Views: 95 million
- Last updated: August 28, 2026

Nicolas Nuvan (born 1994/1995) is a Colombian-born American social media influencer. He is best known for his street interview videos on Instagram and TikTok.

== Life and career ==
Nuvan was born in Colombia. At the age of four, he and his family emigrated to the United States. He attended Rutgers University, graduating in 2017. After graduating, he worked at an Amazon warehouse in Northern California.

Nuvan created his Instagram account in June 2012. After posting his first street interview video, he gained popularity and positive responses, encouraging him to post more street interview videos in his account and on TikTok, traveling and interviewing people from Florida, New York, Texas, Saint Vincent and the Grenadines, Trinidad and Tobago, Jamaica and Haiti. He teamed up with numerous companies as a paid content creator, and helped promote restaurants in Brooklyn, New York.
