= Hettie Morse Chute =

American botanist (1888–1962)

Hettie Morse Chute (1888-1962) was an American-Canadian botanist and professor of botany at Rutgers University.
