= Ann Buchholtz =

Ann K. Buchholtz was Professor of Leadership and Ethics and Research Director of the Institute for Ethical Leadership at Rutgers University. She served on the Board of Governors of the Academy of Management and was past Division Chair of the Social Issues in Management (SIM) division, as well as inaugural Chairperson of the Ethics Adjudication Committee at Academy of Management. She also served on the editorial board of Business & Society. She died on September 14, 2015, from complications related to surgery.

== Academic research ==
Buchholtz' research on ethics, social responsibility, and corporate governance was published in leading management journals, including Academy of Management Journal, Academy of Management Review, Business and Society, Business Ethics Quarterly, Journal of Management, Journal of Management Studies, Organization Science.

== Academic career ==
Buchholtz received her Ph.D. from the Stern School of Business, New York University. She taught undergraduate, MBA and doctoral courses in strategic management, business ethics, organization theory, and others at Rutgers University, University of Georgia, and University of Connecticut.

== Books ==
With Archie Carroll, Buchholtz co-authored Business and Society: Ethics and Stakeholder Management.
