= Jeremy Zuttah =

American football player (born 1986)

No. 76, 53
- Position: Center

Personal information
- Born: June 1, 1986 (age 40); Edison, New Jersey, U.S.
- Listed height: 6 ft 4 in (1.93 m)
- Listed weight: 300 lb (136 kg)

Career information
- High school: J. P. Stevens (Edison)
- College: Rutgers
- NFL draft: 2008: 3rd round, 83rd overall pick

Career history
- Tampa Bay Buccaneers (2008–2013); Baltimore Ravens (2014–2016); San Francisco 49ers (2017)*; Baltimore Ravens (2017)*
- * Offseason or practice squad member only

Awards and highlights
- Pro Bowl (2016); 2× First-team All-Big East (2006, 2007)

Career NFL statistics
- Games played: 131
- Games started: 117
- Stats at Pro Football Reference

Jeremy Kwasi Zuttah (born June 1, 1986) is an American former professional football player who was a center in the National Football League (NFL). He played college football for the Rutgers Scarlet Knights and was selected by the Tampa Bay Buccaneers in the third round of the 2008 NFL draft. He was also a member of the Baltimore Ravens and San Francisco 49ers.

== Early life ==
Zuttah started for three years for the J. P. Stevens High School football team, becoming a highly touted prospect and turning down several college football powers for Rutgers. Zuttah's career followed in the footsteps of his older brother Jeff, who committed to the University of Michigan in 2003, but never played a down after team doctors became concerned about his sickle-cell anemia. Jeff later transferred to Stanford University.

He was rated a three-star recruit by Rivals.com while being recruited. Zuttah commented that his final three schools came down to Rutgers, Maryland, and Pittsburgh.

== College career ==
As a true freshman in 2004, Zuttah was a reserve player, appearing in nine games, with five starts at both tackle spots and left guard. In 2005, Zuttah started at left guard next to Pedro Sosa, forming a top combination that helped pave the way for Ray Rice during his freshman season. In 2006, Rutgers switched to a zone blocking scheme, and Zuttah subsequently moved to right tackle, in order to better utilize his athleticism in the scheme. Emerging as a vocal team leader, Zuttah earned all-Big East honors as the Rutgers offensive line only surrendered 8 sacks all season, the fewest in all of Division I-A, also ranking fifteenth in the nation in rushing.

In 2007, Zuttah was named to the preseason watch lists for the Outland Trophy and the Rotary Lombardi Award. He has been named a pre-season All-America by Athlon Sports. Zuttah was named to the 2007 Big East All-Academic and All-Conference teams. An excellent student, Zuttah graduated Rutgers with an economics degree in 3.5 years.

== Professional career ==
Pre-draft measurables
Height	Weight	Arm length	Hand span	40-yard dash	10-yard split	20-yard split	20-yard shuttle	Three-cone drill	Vertical jump	Broad jump	Bench press
6 ft 3 3/8 in (1.91 m)	295 lb (134 kg)	33 1/2 in (0.85 m)	9 1/2 in (0.24 m)	4.99 s	1.73 s	2.87 s	4.54 s	7.59 s	26.5 in (0.67 m)	8 ft 11 in (2.72 m)	35 reps
All values from NFL Combine

=== Tampa Bay Buccaneers ===
Zuttah was selected by the Tampa Bay Buccaneers in the third round (83rd overall) of the 2008 NFL draft. He signed a multi-year contract with the team on July 22. After 4 seasons with the Buccaneers, Zuttah had played in 58 games, starting 44 of them. Of those 44 games, Zuttah started 30 games at left guard, 9 games at center, and 5 games at right guard. Due to his versatility, on March 5, 2012, Zuttah signed a 4-year contract to remain with the Tampa Bay Buccaneers.

=== Baltimore Ravens (first stint) ===
On March 23, 2014, Zuttah was traded from the Buccaneers to the Baltimore Ravens in exchange for a fifth round pick in the 2015 NFL draft. On November 18, 2015, he was placed on injured reserve with a torn pectoral, ending his season.

On January 23, 2017, Zuttah was named to his first Pro Bowl for his efforts in the 2016 regular season. He replaced Pittsburgh Steelers center Maurkice Pouncey.

=== San Francisco 49ers ===
On March 15, 2017, the Ravens traded Zuttah and a 2017 sixth-round draft pick to the San Francisco 49ers for their 2017 sixth-round draft pick. He was released on August 9.

=== Baltimore Ravens (second stint) ===
On August 18, 2017, Zuttah re-signed with the Ravens. On September 1, he was released by the Ravens during final roster cuts.
