= Sandra Saouaf =

American immunologist

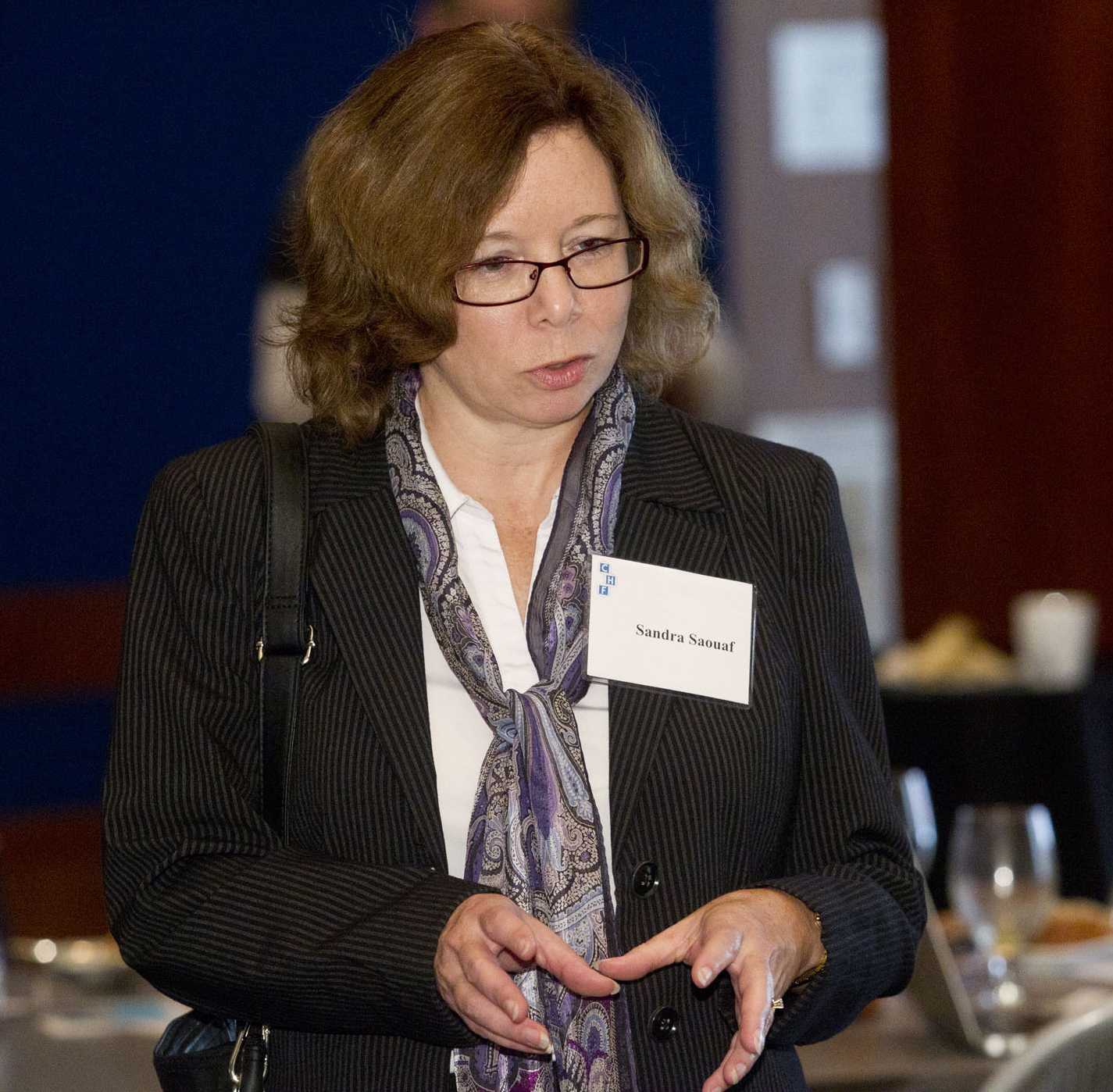
- Chemical Heritage Foundation, Philadelphia, PA, 2011
- Other names: Sandra Jerrold-Jones, Sandra J. Saouaf
- Education: Rutgers College; University of Pennsylvania
- Occupation: immunologist
- Years active: 1995-present
- Employer(s): Bristol-Myers Squibb; GlaxoSmithKline; University of Pennsylvania; Atlantic Bio Sci, LLC

Sandra Saouaf is an American immunologist who researches autoimmune diseases, such as rheumatoid arthritis, type 1 diabetes, multiple sclerosis and others.

== Biography ==
Sandra Jerrold-Jones obtained a BA from Rutgers College in biochemistry and went on to earn a PhD in immunology from the University of Pennsylvania. After completion of her degree, Saouaf went to work in the cell signaling laboratory of Bristol-Myers Squibb where she completed her post doctorate fellowship. She then worked briefly at GlaxoSmithKline before returning to the University of Pennsylvania. Saouaf left the university and began a consulting business with pharmaceutical and biotechnical companies, hoping to help speed the process of discoveries for drugs to treat autoimmune disease. In 2012, together with University of Pennsylvania colleagues, she "discovered a possible treatment approach...through oral drugs" and founded Atlantic Bio Sci, LLC. In 2013, she won a Fellowship from the Alliance of Women Entrepreneurs.

== Selected works ==
- Weiner, D B; Williams, W V; Siegel, R M; Jerrold-Jones, S; et al. (January 1989). "Molecular characterization of suppressor T cells". Transplantation Proceedings. 20 (6): 1151–1153. PMID 2974197.
- Siegel, Richard M; Katsumata, Makoto; Komori, Shinji; Jerrold-Jones, Sandra; et al. (December 1990). "Mechanisms of Autoimmunity in the Context of T-Cell Tolerance: Insights from Natural and Transgenic Animal Model Systems". Immunological Reviews. 118 (1): 165–192. doi:10.1111/j.1600-065X.1990.tb00816.x. PMID 2150401. S2CID 24544491.
- Saouaf, Sandra J; Mahajan, Sandeep; Rowley, R Bruce; Kut, Stephanie A; et al. (September 1994). "Temporal Differences in the Activation of Three Classes of Non-Transmembrane Protein Tyrosine Kinases Following B-Cell Antigen Receptor Surface Engagement". Proceedings of the National Academy of Sciences of the United States of America. 91 (20): 9524–9528. Bibcode:1994PNAS...91.9524S. doi:10.1073/pnas.91.20.9524. PMC 44845. PMID 7524079.
- Saouaf, Sandra J; Kut, Stephanie A; Fargnoli, Joseph; Rowley, R Bruce; et al. (1995). "Reconstitution of the B cell antigen receptor signaling components in COS cells". The Journal of Biological Chemistry. 270 (45): 27072–8. doi:10.1074/jbc.270.45.27072. PMID 7592958.
- Saouaf, Sandra J; Brennan, Patrick J; Shen, Yuan; Greene, Mark I. (December 2003). "Mechanisms of peripheral immune tolerance: Conversion of the immune to the unresponsive phenotype". Immunologic Research. 28 (3): 193–199. doi:10.1385/ir:28:3:193. PMID 14713714. S2CID 27480991.
- Iacono, Kathryn T.; Brown, Amy L.; Greene, Mark I.; Saouaf, Sandra J. (December 2007). "CD147 Immunoglobulin Superfamily Receptor Function and Role in Pathology". Experimental and Molecular Pathology. 83 (3): 283–295. doi:10.1016/j.yexmp.2007.08.014. PMC 2211739. PMID 17945211.
- Saouaf, Sandra J; Brennan, Patrick J; Shen, Yuan; Greene, Mark I. (October 2009). "Deacetylase inhibition increases regulatory T cell function and decreases incidence and severity of collagen-induced arthritis". Experimental and Molecular Pathology. 87 (2): 99–104. doi:10.1016/j.yexmp.2009.06.003. PMC 2753738. PMID 19577564.

== Bibliography ==
- Gupta, Sudhir; Paul, William E.; DeFranco, Anthony; Perlmutter, Roger (2013). Mechanisms of Lymphocyte Activation and Immune Regulation V: Molecular Basis of Signal Transduction. New York: Springer Science & Business Media. ISBN 978-1-4899-0987-9.
