= Richard Bartha =

American microbiologist

Richard Bartha (15 November 1934 - 11 August 2025) was an American microbiologist. He is best known professionally for his seminal discoveries in the field of bacterial pollution control ("bioremediation").

== Life ==
Dr. Bartha and graduate student Ronald Atlas were the first to discover that bacteria are capable of metabolizing petroleum, paving the way for the use of "oil-eating bacteria" to clean up oil spills. Dr. Bartha also made important discoveries regarding the abilities of bacteria to degrade other pollutants, such as pesticides, polyaromatic hydrocarbons, chlorinated organic compounds, and metals.

Dr. Bartha spent his childhood in Budapest, where he attended university. During his college years he participated in the 1956 Hungarian Revolution, in which Hungarians took up arms against their communist government and against the occupying forces of the Soviet Union. When the uprising was quashed by Soviet forces, Dr. Bartha escaped to the Federal Republic of Germany (then known as "West Germany"), where he undertook his doctoral studies. He earned his Ph.D. from the University of Göttingen in 1961, working in the laboratory of Dr. Hans Günter Schlegel. In 1962 Dr. Bartha came to the United States of America to conduct his post-doctoral work at the University of Washington. After his post-doc he taught at Rutgers University in the Department of Biochemistry and Microbiology, from 1964 to 1998.

Dr. Bartha is co-author of the most widely used text on the subject of microbial ecology (written with Ronald Atlas). Dr. Bartha is currently retired, a naturalized citizen of the United States of America. His professional reputation is matched by his warm and congenial manner with colleagues.

== Works ==
- Ronald M. Atlas; Richard Bartha (1987). Microbial ecology: fundamentals and applications. Benjamin/Cummings. ISBN 978-0-201-00300-0.
- Donald F. Boesch; Nancy N. Rabalais, eds. (1987). "Transport and Transformations of Petroleum: Biological Processes". Long-term environmental effects of offshore oil and gas development. Taylor & Francis. ISBN 978-1-85166-094-0.
- Donald Lee Wise; Debra J. Trantolo, eds. (1994). "Effects of Bioremediation on Toxicity, Mutagenesis, and Microbiota in Hydrocarbon-Polluted Soils". Remediation of hazardous waste contaminated soils. CRC Press. ISBN 978-0-8247-9160-5.
