= Kathryn Uhrich =

American chemist

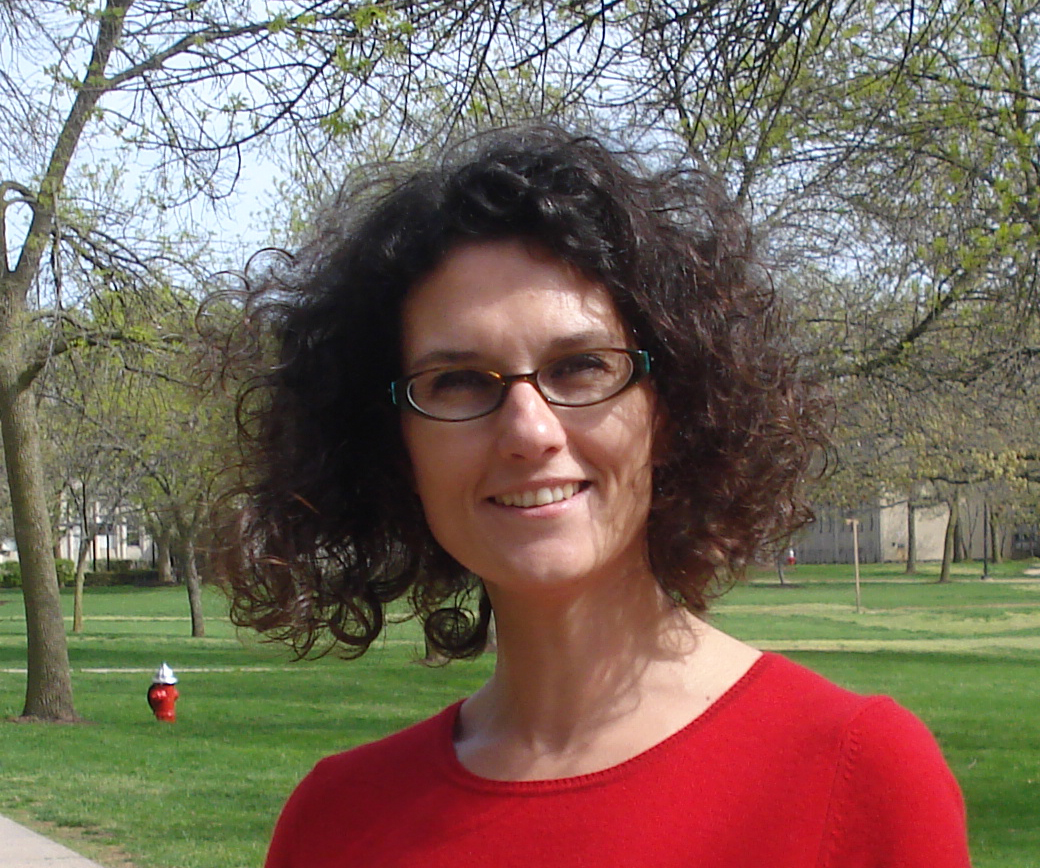
- Kathryn Uhrich, April 2008
- Born: 1965 (age 60–61)
- Education: Grand Forks Central High School
- Alma mater: University of North Dakota, Cornell University
- Known for: Prevention of biofilm formation
- Scientific career
- Fields: Cardiology
- Workplaces: Rutgers University, Polymerix Corporation

Kathryn Uhrich (born 1965) is Dean of the College of Natural and Agricultural Sciences, at The University of California, Riverside, and founder of Polymerix Corporation. She has received many awards for her research and work including the ACS Buck-Whitney Award and the Sioux Award. She was a fellow at both the National Academy of Inventors and the American Chemical Society in 2014.

== Research ==
Her research mainly focuses on biodegradable polymers for use in dental and medical applications. These polymers consist of esters, amides and anhydrides, all of which are susceptible to hydrolysis, thus ensuring the breakdown of the polymer in the body's watery milieu.

The oldest version of aspirin came from Hippocrates in the fifth century BC, while the latest version, PolyAspirin, comes from Uhrich's lab at Rutgers University. Polyaspirine consists of anhydrides and esters that hydrolytically degrade into the active ingredient in aspirin (salicylic acid). Her research was highlighted in "Aspirin: The Remarkable Story of a Wonder Drug" by Diarmuid Jeffreys. Although the polymer was originally designed for biodegradable sutures, PolyAspirin is now undergoing clinical trials as a material for a new type of cardiac stent. This biodegradable stent controls the inflammation effects occurring after angioplasty, called restenosis and disappears when no longer needed.

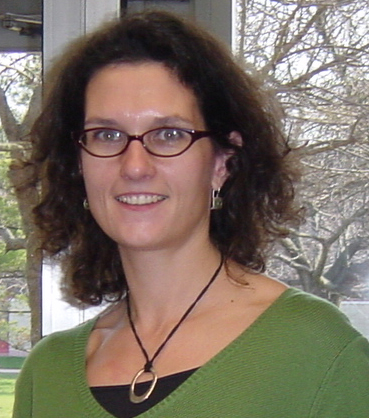
Kathryn Uhrich at Rutgers

Uhrich has collaborated with Professor Michael Tchikindas in the Rutgers Food Science department to investigate PolyAspirin and other plant-based polymers as a method for prevention of biofilm formation by microbes such as E. coli and Salmonella in food.

In 1997, Uhrich first patented PolyAspirin. All of Uhrich's inventions were originally licensed to Polymerix Corporation in 2000, to develop biodegradable polymerized drugs, and now being licensed through Rutgers. The technology includes more efficient delivery to targeted areas such as orthopedic implants, coronary stents and arthritic joints. Uhrich has at least 16 patents in the US and 160 patent applications pending worldwide, all of which are coordinated by Rutgers OCLTT.

Uhrich's second research line is on polymeric micelles. Like soap, these polymers have a hydrophilic 'head' and a hydrophobic 'tail'. These molecules form a spherical particle in which you can pack a hydrophobic drug molecule. Uhrich's research group investigates two general classes of nanoscale polymeric micelles: amphiphilic star-like macromolecules (ASMs) and amphiphilic scorpion-like macromolecules (AScMs); both systems facilitate drug transport. ASMs behave as unimolecular micelles, where four polymer particles are covalently bound. AScMs consist of part of the star like macromolecules, and must first aggregate to form micellar structures. Because AScMs are easier to synthesize and have similar properties, the polymers are undergoing further proof of principle research in gene delivery of siRNA and plasmid DNA with Professor Charlie Roth.

Also, the anionic (negatively charged) scorpion-like molecules inhibit cellular uptake of oxidized LDL, the 'bad' cholesterol in the body. This type of LDL is usually incorporated in macrophages, resulting in foam cell formation and formation of an atherosclerotic plaque which narrows or blocks the arteries. Contrary to most anti-atherosclerotic drugs, the anionic polymer only targets LDL particles and not HDL particles. The delivery of these polymeric particles is now undergoing investigation with Professor Prabhas Moghe.

Thirdly, her group is interested in micro-sized striped patterns of protein (such as serum albumin, immunoglobulin G, laminin and other growth factors) on biocompatible polymeric substrates (such as poly(methylmethacrylate) or PMMA). These proteins promote neuron cell growth, but are not always large enough to bridge the gap caused by injury and restore function to the nerve. Thus, Uhrich investigates the optimal dimensions for promoting neuronal growth in conjugation with Professors Helen Buettner, Martin Grumet and David Shreiber, and the most effective patterning method to generate protein gradients. More recently, Uhrich's group is collaborating with Professor Sally Meiners of UMDNJ to create nerve guidance conduits from biodegradable polymers.

== Awards ==
- 2014, Fellow, American Chemical Society
- 2014, Fellow, National Academy of Inventors
- 2013, Sioux Award,
- 2013, Common Pathways Award, New Jersey Association for Biomedical Research
- 2007, Blavatnik Awards for Young Scientists, Finalist, New York Academy of Science
- 2006, Hall of Fame: Technology (Polymerix), New Jersey Technology Council
- 2005, New Jersey's Top Pharmaceutical Companies (Polymerix), NJBiz
- 2005, ACS Buck-Whitney Award
- 2004, Outstanding Scientist – New Jersey Association for Biomedical Research
- 2003, Thomas Alva Edison Patent Award: Medical/Technology Transfer, Research and Development Council of New Jersey
- 2003, Fellow, American Institute for Medical and Biological Engineering
- 2000–2004, National Science Foundation CAREER Award
- 1996–1998, Johnson & Johnson Discovery Award, Johnson & Johnson Inc.

== Education ==
- Grand Forks Central High School
- University of North Dakota, B.S. 1986
- Cornell University, M.S. 1989
- Cornell University, Ph.D. 1992

== Professional career ==
- researcher in the division of Lithographic Materials and Chemical Engineering, AT&T Bell Laboratories, 1992–1993
- researcher in the Corporate Research Laboratories, Eastman Kodak Company, 1990
- researcher for the Energy Research Center, 1984–1986
