= List of cutaneous conditions associated with internal malignancy =

This is a list of cutaneous conditions associated with internal malignancy; skin markers of internal cancer. It does not include skin infections associated with cancer or cancers that spread to skin. Some have stronger associations with cancers than others.

Cutaneous conditions associated with internal benign tumors and/or malignancies
Cutaneous condition	Internal malignancy
Erythema gyratum repens	Lung cancer
Hypertrichosis lanuginosa acquisita	Lung cancer
Paraneoplastic pemphigus	Non-Hodgkin lymphoma (Note: Non-Hodgkin lymphoma is the most common cause of paraneoplastic pemphigus in adults. Castleman's disease is the most common cause of paraneoplastic pemphigus in children.); Chronic lymphocytic leukemia Castleman's disease Sarcoma; Thymoma
Tripe palms	Lung cancer
Tripe palms with acanthosis nigricans	Stomach cancer
Pityriasis rotunda	Hepatocellular carcinoma
Migratory thrombophlebitis	Pancreatic adenocarcinoma
Leser–Trélat sign	Gastrointestinal adenocarcinoma
Acquired ichthyosis	Hodgkin disease
Pityriasis rotunda	Hepatocellular carcinoma
Paraneoplastic pigmentation	Small cell bronchial carcinoma
Acrokeratosis paraneoplastica	Squamous cell carcinoma of the upper respiratory or gastrointestinal tracts
Necrolytic migratory erythema	Glucagon secreting pancreatic islet cell adenoma
Dermatomyositis	Lung cancer in men, breast and gynaecological tumours in women and colorectal cancers in both sexes
Scleroderma‐like skin changes	Carcinoid syndrome
Paraneoplastic pemphigus	B‐cell proliferations and thymoma or thymoma‐like neoplasms; specifically Non Hodgkin's lymphoma (42%)
Dermatitis herpetiformis	Lymphoma
Porphyria cutanea tarda and variegate porphyrias	Hepatocellular Carcinoma
Erythroderma and exfoliative dermatitis	Mycosis fungoides or Sézary syndrome
Pyoderma gangrenosum	Hematological malignancy
Sweet syndrome	Hematological malignancy

== See also ==
- List of target antigens in pemphigus
- List of cutaneous conditions
- List of genes mutated in cutaneous conditions
- List of cutaneous conditions caused by mutations in keratins

== Bibliography ==
- Bolognia, Jean L.; et al. (2007). Dermatology. St. Louis: Mosby. ISBN 978-1-4160-2999-1.
- James, William D.; et al. (2006). Andrews' Diseases of the Skin: Clinical Dermatology. Saunders Elsevier. ISBN 0-7216-2921-0.
