= Robert A. Schwartz =

American physician (born 1947)

Robert A. Schwartz FRCP Edin
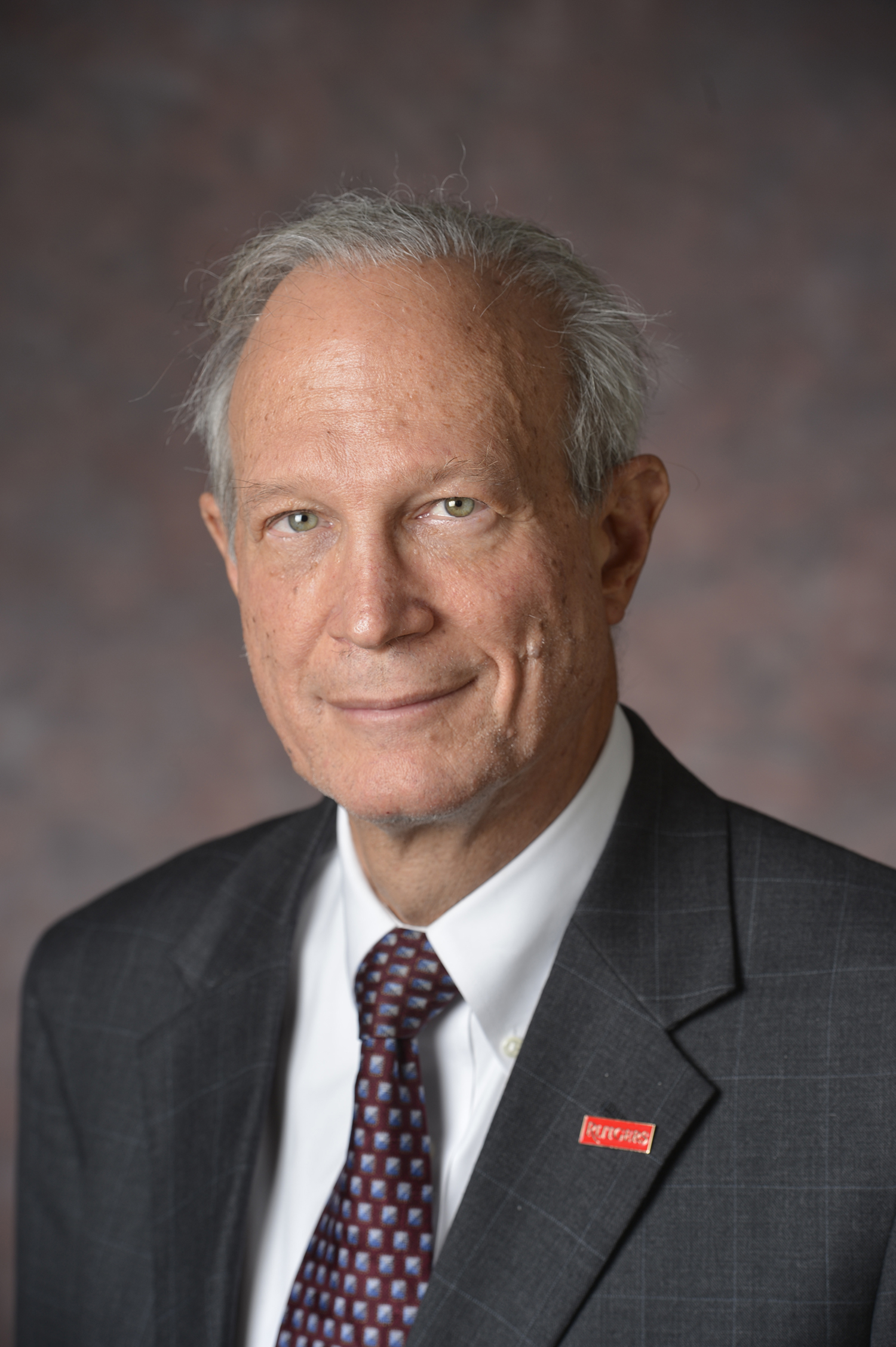

Member of the Presidential Advisory Council on HIV/AIDS
- Incumbent
- Assumed office March 14, 2019
- President: Donald Trump

Member of the Rutgers University Board of Trustees
- Incumbent
- Assumed office July 1, 2014 ^{1}
- Preceded by: Asha Samant

Personal details
- Born: Robert Allen Schwartz; June 30, 1947 (age 79) Oakland, California, U.S.
- Spouse(s): Camila Krysicka Janniger (m. 1984–present)
- Children: Edmund Janniger
- Education: University of California, Berkeley (BA); University of California, Berkeley School of Public Health (MPH); New York Medical College (MD)
- Profession: Physician; Biomedical researcher university professor
- Website: Official website
- 1. As Faculty Representative

Robert Allen Schwartz FRCP Edin (born June 30, 1947) is an American physician, biomedical researcher, university professor, and government official. He is Professor and Head of Dermatology, Professor of Medicine, Professor of Pediatrics, and Professor of Preventive Medicine and Community Health at the Rutgers New Jersey Medical School, Visiting Professor and Scholar of Public Affairs and Administration at the Rutgers School of Public Affairs and Administration, and serves on the Rutgers University Board of Trustees. He has made seminal contributions to medicine, including the discovery of AIDS-associated Kaposi sarcoma (KS-AIDS) and Schwartz–Burgess syndrome. In 2019 Schwartz joined the Trump administration as a member of the Presidential Advisory Council on HIV/AIDS.

He earned a Bachelor of Arts in political science at the University of California, Berkeley in 1969, a Master of Public Health at the University of California, Berkeley School of Public Health in 1970, and a Doctor of Medicine at the New York Medical College in 1974, from which he graduated at the top of his class as a member of the Alpha Omega Alpha Honor Medical Society. He trained in dermatology at the University of Cincinnati and at Roswell Park Comprehensive Cancer Center. He advanced in academia, from the University of Arizona and the University of California, San Francisco, to the Rutgers New Jersey Medical School, where in 1983 he became the first permanent head of dermatology, establishing a dermatology residency program in 1984.

In 1981 Schwartz led one of the three groups that first described AIDS-associated Kaposi sarcoma (KS-AIDS). In 1978 he first described florid cutaneous papillomatosis. Schwartz is credited with the clinical description of new subtypes of Kaposi's sarcoma: telangiectatic Kaposi's sarcoma, keloidal Kaposi's sarcoma and ecchymotic Kaposi’s sarcoma. In 1981 he first described acral acanthotic anomaly (acral acanthosis nigricans). In 1980 Edmund Klein, Schwartz and associates published in Cancer one of the first effective treatments of Kaposi’s sarcoma, a type of cancer that became more frequent as the AIDS epidemic unfolded.

Schwartz has authored several books, including Skin Cancer: Recognition and Management, a leading book on cutaneous oncology currently in its second edition. Schwartz has also written 10 monographs, and is the author of over 250 book chapters, 500 articles, and 200 other publications. He has lectured in more than 30 different countries and, for eighteen consecutive years, was on the faculty of the annual meeting of the American Academy of Dermatology. Schwartz has been elected an honorary member of more than 20 national dermatologic societies. He has received multiple honorary doctorates.

== Early life and education ==
Robert Allen Schwartz was born on June 30, 1947, in Oakland, California. He spent his four undergraduate years at the University of California, Berkeley, graduating with a Bachelor of Arts in political science in 1969. He remained there to earn a Master of Public Health degree in 1970 from the University of California, Berkeley School of Public Health. He then matriculated into the New York Medical College in Manhattan, from which he graduated as a member of the Alpha Omega Alpha Honor Medical Society in 1974. He trained in dermatology at the University of Cincinnati College of Medicine and at Roswell Park Comprehensive Cancer Center. He later completed a fellowship in dermatopathology. Schwartz is board certified in dermatology and in diagnostic and laboratory immunology.

== Academic career ==
Schwartz advanced in academia, from the University of Arizona and the University of California, San Francisco to the Rutgers New Jersey Medical School, where in 1983 he became the first permanent head of dermatology, establishing a dermatology residency program in 1984. He is Professor and Dead of dermatology, Professor of Medicine, Professor of Pediatrics, and Professor of Preventive Medicine and Community Health at the Rutgers New Jersey Medical School. He is a Visiting Professor and Scholar of Public Affairs and Administration at the Rutgers School of Public Affairs and Administration. In 2014 Schwartz began serving on the Rutgers University Board of Trustees.

Schwartz is also in his second term as President of the World Health Academy, serving from 2011 to 2012 and 2014 to present, and has been active on National Institutes of Health study sections since 2004. Schwartz has served as Faculty President of the Rutgers New Jersey Medical School in 1993 and 1995 and as Chairman of its Committee on Appointments and Promotions twice.

He has been involved in many campus activities, including as Sigma Xi Scientific Research Society chapter president and Alpha Omega Alpha National Honor Society chapter councilor. He received the Faculty of the Year Award at the Rutgers New Jersey Medical School in 2002 and has been chosen as Top Doctor multiple times by New York Magazine, Inside Jersey, and Castle-Conolly Guide to Best Physicians. A two-time past president of the Dermatology Section of the New York Academy of Medicine, he has been elected to a third five-year term on the Board of Directors of the International Society of Dermatology.

Schwartz has authored several books, most recently Skin Cancer: Recognition and Management, a leading book on cutaneous oncology currently in its second edition. He has written or edited 10 monographs, and is the author of over 250 book chapters, 500 articles, and 200 other publications. Many of these are in the area of dermatologic oncology, where he has had a special interest in epidermal tumors, paraneoplastic syndromes, and Kaposi’s sarcoma. He has published more than 50 full articles on Kaposi’s sarcoma since 1978, including one of the first three reports of KS-AIDS in 1981. He was the first to describe many Kaposi's sarcoma morphologic variants. In 1978 he first described florid cutaneous papillomatosis. In 1981 he discovered and described acral acanthosis nigricans. In 1994 he devised the commonly accepted classification for acanthosis nigricans.

=== Editorial activity ===
He has served as editor of the Acta Dermatovenerologica Alpina Panonica Adriatica, assistant editor of the Journal of the American Academy of Dermatology, associate editor of Cutis and Acta Dermatovenerologica Croatica, deputy editor of Mycoses, contributing editor of Dermatologic Surgery, and section editor of the Journal of Surgical Oncology. He is a member of the editorial boards of numerous journals, including American Family Physician, Anais Brasileiros de Dermatologia, International Journal of Dermatology, Indian Journal of Dermatology, Venereology and Leprology, Indian Journal of Dermatology, Giornale Italiano di Dermatologia e Venereologia, Postępy Dermatologii i Alergologii, Journal of the European Academy of Dermatology and Venereology, and Cesko-Slovenská Dermatologie.

== Government career ==
Schwartz joined the Trump administration as a member of the Presidential Advisory Council on HIV/AIDS in 2019.

== Honors and awards ==
A partial list of Schwartz's honors and awards.

=== Decorations ===
==== Orders and awards ====
Award or decoration	Country	Date	Place	Note	Ref
Hieronymus Fracastorus Medal	Italy	2003	Capri	Awarded at the 31st Italian National Congress.	
Academia Medica Wratislaviensis Polonia Medal	Poland	2007	Wrocław	The highest award bestowed by Wrocław Medical University.	
Stefan G. Nicolau Medal	Romania	2008	Bucharest	The highest award given by the Romanian Society of Dermatology.	
International Corresponding Membership in the Amazonian Academy of Medicine	Brazil	2010	Manaus		
Amazonian Academy of Medicine Medal	Brazil	2010	Manaus	The highest award given by the Amazonian Academy of Medicine.	

=== Honorary ===
==== Honorary doctorates ====
Institution	Degree	Location	Date	Note	Ref
Tbilisi Medical Academy	Doctor of Science	(Georgia (country)) Tbilisi, Georgia	2013	"for his important contributions to the field of medicine, including original work in the acquired immune deficiency syndrome (AIDS) and Kaposi's sarcoma."	
China Medical University	hon. prof.	Shenyang, China	2012	Conferred by the CMU president in an official ceremony.	

== Personal life ==
In 1984, Schwartz married Camila Krysicka, a dermatologist and academic. Their son Edmund Janniger was an advisor to Polish Defence Minister Antoni Macierewicz for a short period of time in 2015.

== Bibliography ==
- Gao, Xing-Hua; Chen, Hong-Duo (2013). "Professor Robert A. Schwartz Awarded Title of Honorary Professor, China Medical University, Shenyang, November 20, 2012". International Journal of Dermatology. 52 (2): 262. doi:10.1111/ijd.12131_2. ISSN 0011-9059. S2CID 73381269.
- Lahiri, Koushik (2017). "Chittaranjan national cancer institute honors professor Robert A. Schwartz". Indian Journal of Dermatology. 62 (1): 111. doi:10.4103/0019-5154.198055. ISSN 0019-5154. PMC 5286747.

Academic offices
Preceded by Asha Samant	Member of the Rutgers University Board of Trustees; 2014–present	Incumbent
Government offices
Preceded by —	Member of the Presidential Advisory Council on HIV/AIDS; 2019–present	Incumbent
