= Leser =

Leser is a surname. Notable people with the surname include:

- Benno Max Leser-Lasario, Austrian physician, singer and breathing instructor
- C. E. V. Leser (1915–1998), German-born econometrician
- Edmund Leser (1828–1916), German surgeon (Leser–Trélat sign)
- Emanuel Leser (1849–1914), German economist
- Ludwig Leser (1890–1946), Austrian politician
- Norbert Leser (1933–2014), Austrian social philosopher
- Oscar Leser (Leser v. Garnett, 1922)
- Paul Leser (1899–1984), German-born American ethnologist
- Tina Leser (1910–1986), American fashion designer
