= Florid cutaneous papillomatosis =

- Other names: Schwartz–Burgess syndrome
- Specialty: Dermatology

Florid cutaneous papillomatosis (FCP) is an obligate paraneoplastic syndrome.

FCP begins as the sudden onset of numerous cutaneous papillomas that are clinically indistinguishable from viral warts. The papillomas range from 1 to 3 mm in diameter may spread to involve the entire body, including the face. Pruritus, which may sometimes precede the onset of FCP, is evident in the affected regions in about half of patients. Evaluation of a skin biopsy clearly distinguishes FCP from viral warts.

FCP is associated with underlying cancer of the breast, bladder, ovary, uterus, prostate, and lung. Other associated underlying malignancies include squamous cell carcinomas and lymphomas such as non-Hodgkin's lymphoma.

FCP is sometimes seen together with other signs of internal cancer, especially malignant acanthosis nigricans, tripe palms, Leser–Trélat sign, and hypertrichosis lanuginosa acquisita. FCP tends to improve in association with surgical or chemotherapeutic therapy of the underlying internal cancer. A recurrence or exacerbation of FCP may be linked with tumor regrowth or metastatic spread.

== Signs and symptoms ==
The characteristic eruption is of multiple warty papules and nodules beginning on acral skin, especially the hands and wrists, and disseminating onto the skin of the entire body. These skin lesions develop on the trunk, extremities, and face. Pruritus is also associated.

== Causes ==
The etiology of florid cutaneous papillomatosis is unknown. It is likely directly induced by an underlying neoplasm secreting a growth factor. One candidate may be alpha-transforming growth factor, structurally related to epidermal growth factor, but antigenically distinct from it. The underlying cancer is most often gastric adenocarcinoma but also with breast cancer, bladder cancer, hepatobiliary cancer, ovarian cancer, uterine cancer, prostate cancer, lung cancer and cervical cancer. Other associated underlying malignancies include squamous cell carcinomas and lymphomas.

== Pathophysiology ==
Florid cutaneous papillomatosis, malignant acanthosis nigricans, and the sign of Leser-Trélat may be highlighted as part of a continuum, with each having a common or similar pathogenic pathway due to an underlying malignancy that produces a factor epidermal growth factor-like activity.

== Diagnosis ==
The sudden eruption of papulonodules usually indistinguishable from common viral warts should suggest this diagnosis. These papulonodules begin on the extremities, especially on the dorsa of the hands and the wrists and may disseminate to involve the entire body, including the face. The papulonodules may vary in size from 2–3 mm to 10 mm in diameter. Pruritus is often associated.

Florid cutaneous papillomatosis is linked with an underlying cancer. Malignant acanthosis nigricans may also become evident, many times with the sudden eruption of multiple seborrheic keratoses, known as the sign of Leser-Trélat. Florid cutaneous papillomatosis mandates a search for an underlying malignancy, recognizing that it may be seen in patients with multiple visceral carcinomas. Histologic examination shows uniform and pronounced hyperkeratosis, acanthosis, and papillomatosis without epidermal vacuolization, parakeratosis, or eosinophilic inclusions suggestive of viral warts.

The sudden quality of the eruption of florid cutaneous papillomatosis and its anatomic distribution should facilitate distinction from widespread common warts and from epidermodysplasia verruciformis.

== Treatment ==
Identifying and treatment the underlying malignancy constitutes an uptime approach. Topical 5-fluorouracil may occasionally be help, as may oral retinoids, topical steroids, vitamin A acid, urea, salicylic acid, podophyllotoxin, and cryodestruction employing liquid.

== Prognosis ==
Improvement usually parallels that of the cancer, whether surgical or chemotherapeutic. Generalization of the associated visceral malignancy may worsen the eruption.

== Epidemiology ==
Florid cutaneous papillomatosis is almost twice as common in men than in women, and is usually diagnosed in individuals aged 53–72 years (mean patient age, 58.5 years).

== History ==
Florid cutaneous papillomatosis was discovered by Robert A. Schwartz and Gordon H. Burgess. The original description was published in the Archives of Dermatology, which is published by American Medical Association. It has since been called Schwartz–Burgess syndrome.

== Society and culture ==
Patients may have their unaesthetic appearance resulting in isolation from their community, feeling or being unwelcome in public places.

== Bibliography ==
- Weger W, Ginter-Hanselmayer G, Hammer HF, Hödl S (November 2007). "Florid cutaneous papillomatosis with acanthosis nigricans in a patient with carcinomas of the lung and prostate". J. Am. Acad. Dermatol. 57 (5): 907–8. doi:10.1016/j.jaad.2006.02.002. PMID 17939948.
- Dennis Albert Casciato; Mary C. Territo (2009). Manual of Clinical Oncology. Lippincott Williams & Wilkins. p. 588. ISBN 978-0-7817-6884-9.
- Schwartz RA (1993). "Florid cutaneous papillomatosis". Clin. Dermatol. 11 (1): 89–91. doi:10.1016/0738-081X(93)90102-I. PMID 8339205.
- De Backer J, Kint A (1971). "Malignant acanthosis nigricans with multiple verrucous formations". Arch Belg Dermatol Syphiligr. 27 (3): 317–22. PMID 5151960.
- Dennis Albert Casciato; Barry Bennett Lowitz (1995). Manual of Clinical Oncology. Little, Brown. p. 477. ISBN 978-0-316-13279-4.
