= Tripe palms =

- Specialty: Dermatology
- Causes: Paraneoplastic syndrome
- Diagnostic method: Appearance
- Frequency: Rare

Tripe palms, also known as acanthosis palmaris, is a medical sign characterized by thick ridged velvety palms, typically as part of a paraneoplastic syndrome. It resembles the lining of the stomach of some animals (tripe). Other signs that may be noted at the same time include most frequently acanthosis nigricans (AN), and less commonly finger clubbing and Leser-Trélat sign.

The sign is rare.

== Signs and symptoms ==
Tripe palms appear as thick ridged velvety palms, typically as part of a paraneoplastic syndrome.

== Cause and mechanism ==
How it occurs is unclear. More than 90% of individuals with the sign have a cancer. In some, both tripe palms and AN appear together before the cancer is diagnosed. Lung cancer is more frequent if the tripe palms present alone, whereas cancer of the stomach is more frequent when AN is also present. The sign has also been associated with bullous pemphigoid, psoriasis, and exfoliative dermatitis. It is believed that growth factors secreted by cancer cells cause some skin cells to grow.

== Diagnosis and treatment ==
Diagnosis is by its appearance and a biopsy is generally not helpful. Other conditions that may appear similar include acromegaly, acrokeratosis paraneoplastica, hypertrophic osteoarthropathy, idiopathic hypertrophic osteoarthropathy, palmoplantar keratoderma, and acropachy. Tripe palms may improve with treatment of the underlying cancer.

== Epidemiology ==
The sign is rare. There are around 100 reported cases worldwide.

== History ==
The term was first coined by Jacqueline Clarke in 1977.

== See also ==
- List of cutaneous conditions associated with internal malignancy
