= Puncta pruritica =

Medical condition

Puncta pruritica (also known as "Itchy points") consists of one or two itchy spots in clinically normal skin, sometimes followed by the appearance of seborrheic keratoses at exactly the same site.

== See also ==
- Pruritus
