= IJD =

IJD or ijd may refer to:

- Indian Journal of Dermatology, a bimonthly peer-reviewed open-access medical journal published in India
- International Journal of Dermatology, a peer-reviewed monthly journal covering all aspects of dermatology
- IJD, the FAA LID code for Windham Airport, Connecticut, United States
