= Émile Trélat =

French politician

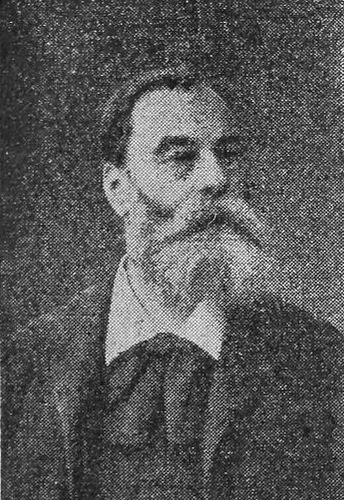

Personal details
- Born: 6 March 1821
- Died: 30 October 1907 (aged 86)
- Education: École Centrale Paris
- Occupation: Architect, politician

Émile Trélat (6 March 1821 – 30 October 1907) was a French politician.

He was the son of Ulysse Trélat and great-grandfather of Gabriel Richet. He graduated at the École Centrale Paris in 1840. He first managed the ceramic factory of Rubelles (Seine-et-Marne), and later turned to architecture. He was a civil construction professor at the Conservatoire national des arts et métiers from 1854 to 1895. In 1865 he founded the École Spéciale d'Architecture. In 1871 he became lead architect of the department of the Seine. He was deputy of the Seine from 1891 to 1898, belonging to the radical party.

== Sources ==
- " Émile Trélat ", dans le DicoParlement1889
