= Dermatosis papulosa nigra =

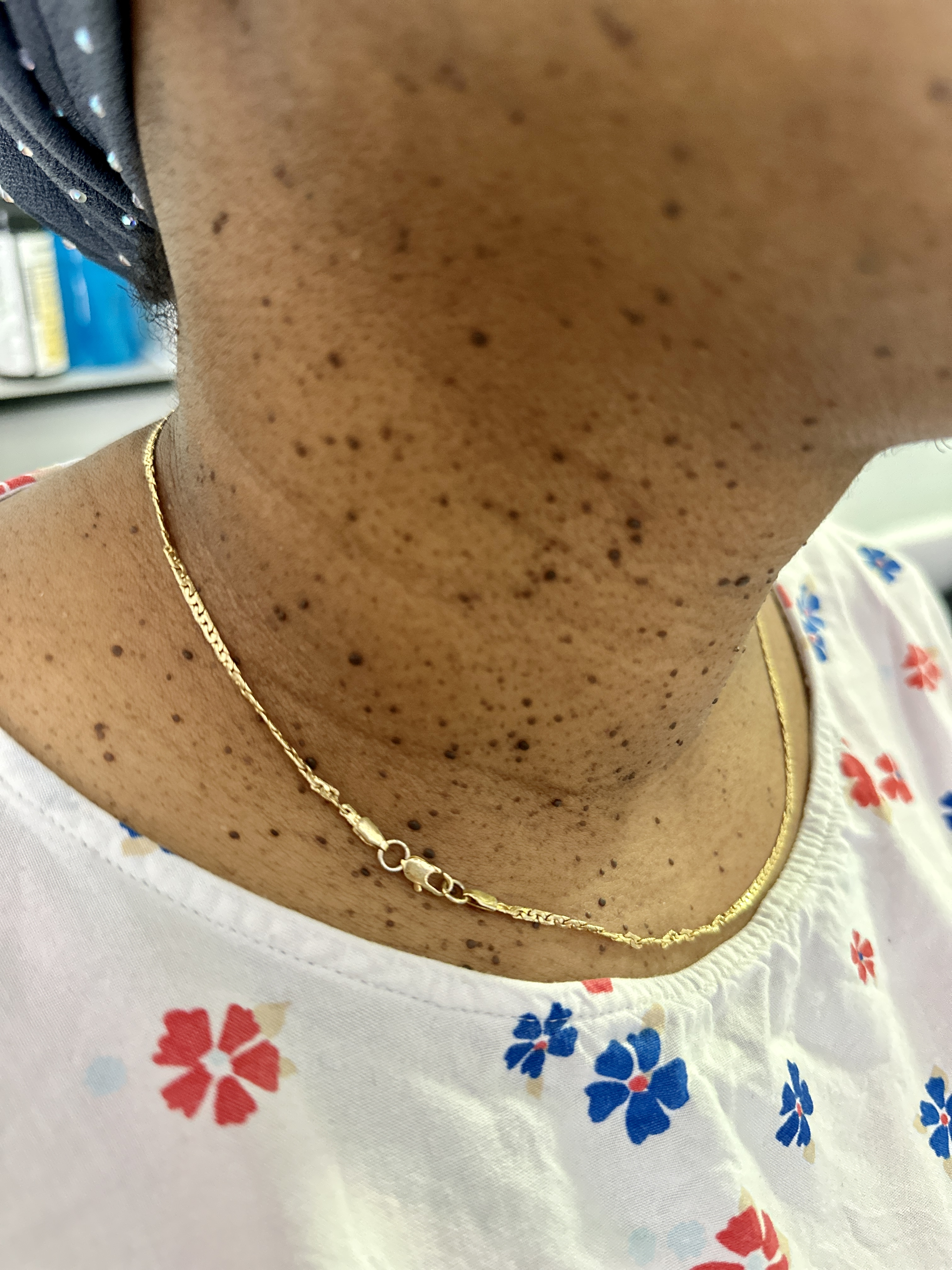
- Dermatosis papulosa nigra
- Specialty: Dermatology
- Differential diagnosis: Seborrheic keratoses
- Frequency: Common

Dermatosis papulosa nigra (DPN) is a condition of many small, benign skin lesions typically on the face and neck, a condition generally presenting on dark-skinned individuals. DPN is extremely common, affecting up to 30% of Black people in the US. From a histological perspective, DPN resembles seborrheic keratoses. The condition may be cosmetically undesirable to some.

Despite its great frequency, DPN was firstly described and named only in 1925 by Italian physician Aldo Castellani.

== Pathophysiology ==
The pathophysiology of DPN is unknown. Evidence of family history may suggest a genetic propensity.

== Treatment ==
DPN lesions are benign and no treatment generally is indicated unless lesions are cosmetically undesirable. Surgical options including curettage, cryotherapy and laser therapy are options. Scarring, postoperative skin discoloration or keloid formation are potential complications. Therefore, conservative DPN treatment is advisable.

== Prognosis ==
DPN is not a pre-malignant condition nor is it associated with any underlying systemic disease. DPN lesions show no tendency to regress spontaneously, and often increase in size and number as an individual ages.

== Epidemiology ==
DPN affects up to 35% of the African American population in the USA. Insufficient data is available on the international frequency of DPN. Lesions generally emerge during puberty, increasing steadily in number and size as an individual ages. The incidence of DPN lesions increases with age. Black people with a fair complexion have the lowest frequency of involvement. DPN also occurs among Asians and Polynesians, although the exact incidence is unknown. Females are affected more frequently than males. Dermatosis papulosa nigra generally emerges in adolescence and is rarely in persons younger than 7 years.

== See also ==
- List of cutaneous conditions
