= Edmund Janniger =

Polish ministerial adviser

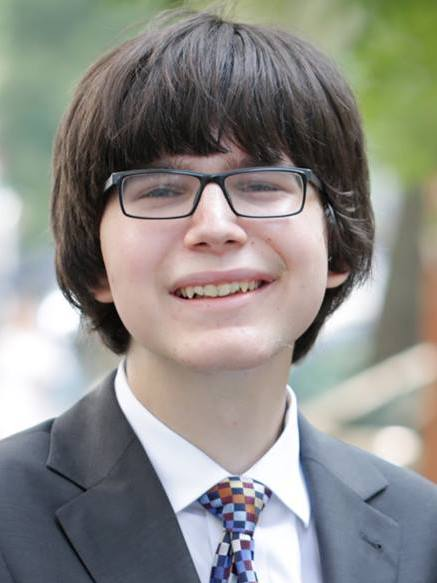
- Janniger in 2015
- Born: 30 December 1995 (age 30)
- Education: Rutgers University School of Public Affairs and Administration
- Parent(s): Camila Krysicka Janniger; Robert A. Schwartz

Edmund Janniger (born 30 December 1995) was a short-time adviser to the Minister of National Defence of Poland Antoni Macierewicz in late 2015. Then 19, he was the youngest ministerial adviser in Poland’s history.

== Biography ==
The son of Robert A. Schwartz and Camila Krysicka, both university professors and physicians. Janniger initially wanted to become a physician, but decided to engage in politics.

Janniger has worked with long-time family friend Antoni Macierewicz for 6 months (some reports state 3 years), initially as his assistant and later as trainee deputy manager in his parliamentary office. In the run-up to the 2015 Polish parliamentary election, Janniger held a post of deputy campaign manager for Law and Justice in the 10th Electoral District where Macierewicz was the party's lead candidate. Grzegorz Rzeczkowski described Janniger as Macierewicz's "inseparable adviser, spin-doctor and defender."

On 16 November 2015, within hours of Macierewicz's appointment as Minister of National Defence, Janniger was appointed as his adviser. His responsibilities included "managing the minister's online presence". The appointment of such a relatively young person to the post met with support of the media sympathetic to the newly elected government and with criticism from those aligned with the opposition.

He held the post officially until 8 December 2015, when he returned to the United States to focus on Institute of Global Affairs, a short-lived club he had established presented by some media as a think tank. In June 2016, however, Dziennik Gazeta Prawna called the actuality of the reported departure into question and in October 2016, investigative journalist Tomasz Piątek of Gazeta Wyborcza found out that Janniger, despite living in the US, was still being employed and paid by the Ministry of National Defence.

In his 2017 book, Piątek scrutinized Janniger's ties and considered them unusual.

Janniger was dubbed as the Altar Boy (Polish: ministrant, wordplay with minister) of National Defence by some journalists due to his involvement with faith leaders.
