= Ulysse Trélat (politician) =

French medical doctor and politician

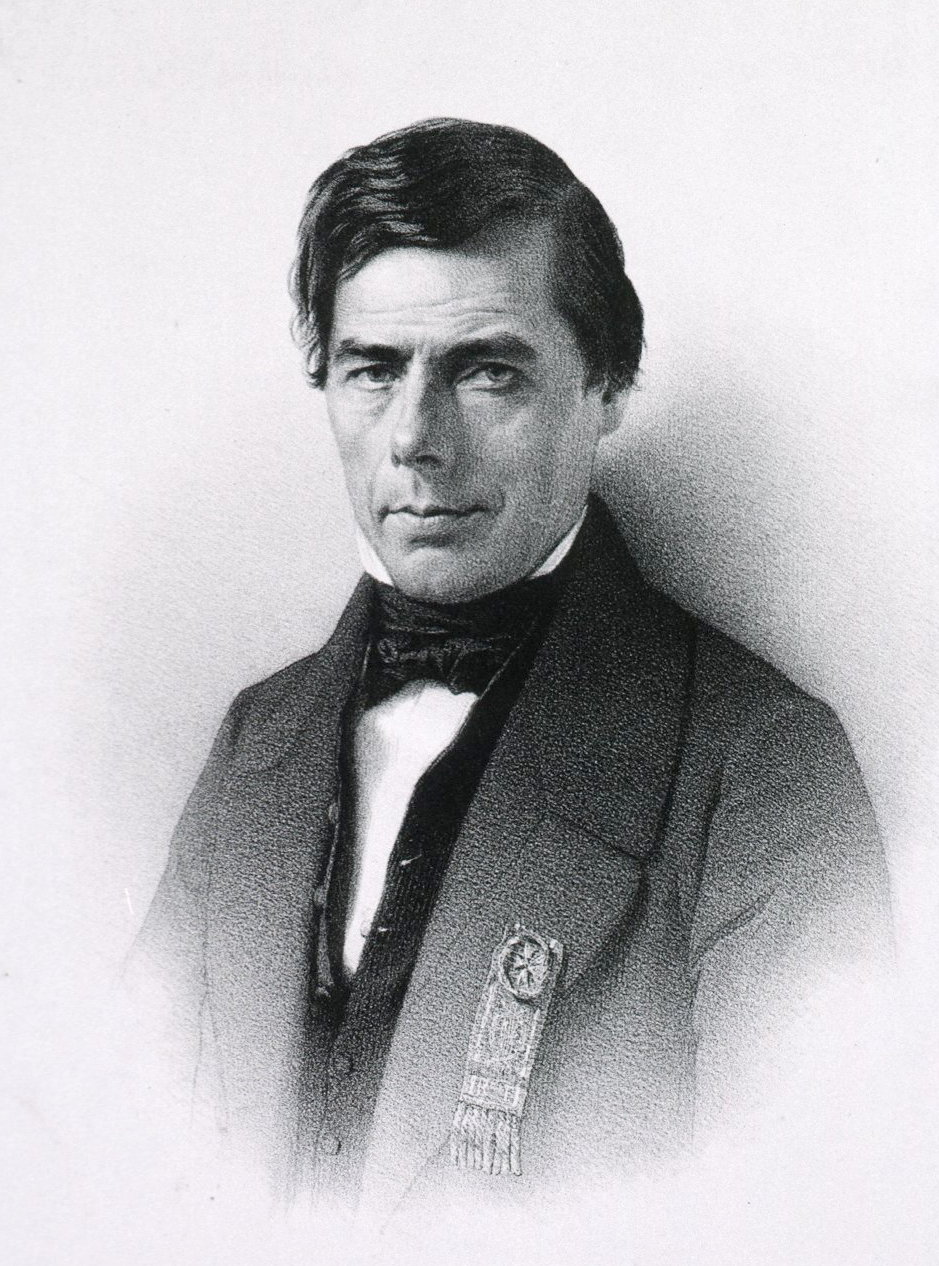
- Portrait from Histoire de l'administration civile dans la province d'Auvergne et le département du Puy-de-Dôme, v4, 1897
- Born: 13 November 1798; Montargis, Loiret, France
- Died: 29 January 1879 (aged 80); Menton, Alpes-Maritimes, France
- Occupations: Physician, politician, political activist

Ulysse Trélat (French: [tʁela]; 13 November 1798 – 29 January 1879) was a French medical doctor and politician. He was a member of the Société des Amis du Peuple and briefly Minister of Public Works.

== Life ==
Ulysse Trélat was born on 13 November 1798 (Note: Other sources give Trélat's year of birth as 1795, which may be more consistent with the date he became a surgeon.) in Montargis, Loiret, the son of a notary. Trélat became a military surgeon in 1813. He interned at Charenton, and became a doctor in medicine in 1821. Trélat was a doctor at the Pitié-Salpêtrière Hospital in 1838.

Trélat was a founding member of the lodge Aide de toi, le ciel t'aidera. He was editor of the Patriote du Puy-de-Dôme. He became colonel in the National Guard, representative for Puy-de-Dôme in 1848 and vice-president of the Constituent Assembly. Trélat was Minister of Public Works from May to June 1848. He was a municipal counselor for Paris (district of the Panthéon) from 1871 to 1874. He died on 29 January 1879 in Menton, Alpes-Maritimes.

== Family ==
Trélat married Marie Jeanne Louise Potin (d. 1838) on 30 December 1826. Their first child was Émile Trélat, born in Paris on 6 March 1821 and later legitimized, who went on to become a Deputy for the Seine from 1891 to 1898. They also had a daughter and two other sons, Alphonse and Ulysse (1828-1890). The latter became a distinguished surgeon and professor.
