= Leser–Trélat sign =

Onset of multiple seborrheic keratoses

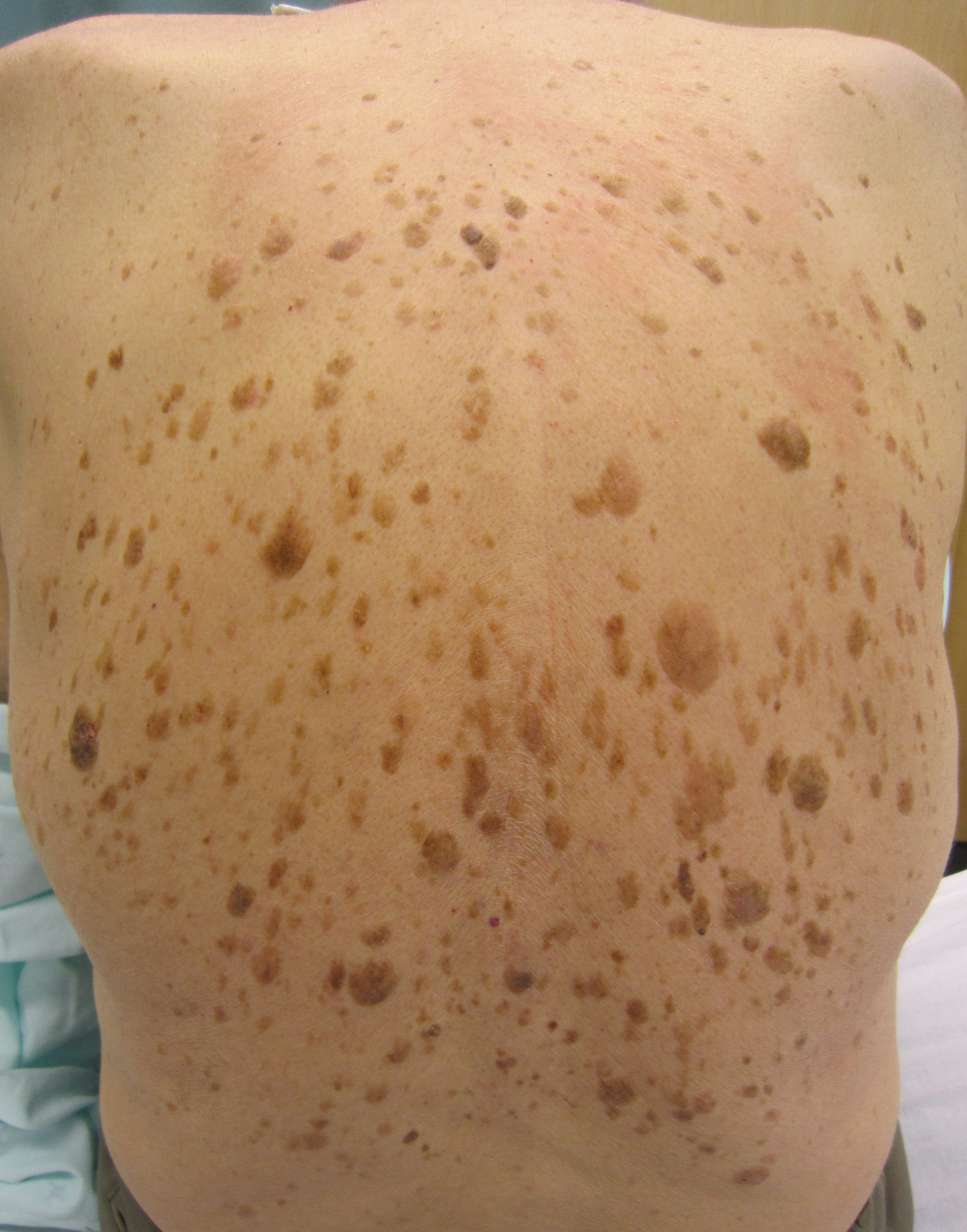
Many seborrheic keratoses on the back of a person with Leser–Trélat sign due to colon cancer

The Leser–Trélat sign is the explosive onset of multiple seborrheic keratoses (many pigmented skin lesions), often with an inflammatory base. This can be a sign of internal malignancy as part of a paraneoplastic syndrome. In addition to the development of new lesions, preexisting ones frequently increase in size and become symptomatic.

== Associations ==
Although most associated neoplasms are gastrointestinal adenocarcinomas (stomach, liver, colorectal and pancreas), malignancies of the breast, lung, and urinary tract, as well as lymphoid tissue, have been associated with this distinctive rash. It is likely that various cytokines and other growth factors produced by the neoplasm are responsible for the abrupt appearance of the seborrheic keratoses.

In some cases, paraneoplastic acanthosis nigricans (35% of patients), florid cutaneous papillomatosis, ichthyosis acquisita (acquired hypertrichosis lanuginosa), Cowden syndrome, tylosis, acrokeratosis paraneoplastica of Bazex or tripe palms accompany the sign of Leser–Trélat.

== History ==
It is named for German surgeon Edmund Leser and French surgeon Ulysse Trélat.

It has been suggested that Leser and Trélat were observing angiomas and not seborrheic keratoses, and so the credit should properly go to Eugen Von Hollander for his 1900 publication.
