= Multiple organ dysfunction syndrome =

Organ dysfunction in an acutely ill person requiring medical intervention

- Other names: Total organ failure, multisystem organ failure, multiple organ failure
- Specialty: Intensive care medicine
- Symptoms: Include, but not limited to: confusion, loss of appetite, fatigue, fever, irregular heartbeat, tachypnea
- Causes: Infection, injury, hypermetabolism
- Treatment: Treating the underlying cause
- Prognosis: Case fatality rate 30–100% depending on the number of organs that fail

Multiple organ dysfunction syndrome (MODS) is altered organ function in an acutely ill patient requiring immediate medical intervention.

There are different stages of organ dysfunction for certain different organs, both in acute and in chronic onset, whether or not there are one or more organs affected. Each stage of dysfunction (whether it be the heart, lung, liver, or kidney) has defined parameters, in terms of laboratory values based on blood and other tests, as to what it is (each of these organs' levels of failure is divided into stage I, II, III, IV, and V). The word "failure" is commonly used to refer to the later stages, especially IV and V, when artificial support usually becomes necessary to sustain life; the damage may or may not be fully or partially reversible.

== Signs and symptoms ==
Multiple organ dysfunction syndrome can trigger a variety of symptoms throughout the body. Because MODS can impact any organ system, the specific symptoms experienced will depend on which organs are affected. Initially, these signs may be mild as the underlying illness progresses towards MODS. However, as the condition worsens, the symptoms can become more severe.

These symptoms include low urine output, nausea, vomiting, and loss of appetite. Some patients experience mental symptoms like confusion and may feel fatigued. Symptoms like fever, chills, irregular heartbeat, and quick/shallow breathing are also common. Multiple cases of MODS also suffer chest and abdominal pain, and patients may even lose consciousness.

== Cause ==
The condition results from infection, injury (accident, surgery), hypoperfusion and hypermetabolism. The primary cause triggers an uncontrolled inflammatory response.

Sepsis is the most common cause of multiple organ dysfunction syndrome and may result in septic shock. In the absence of infection, a sepsis-like disorder is termed systemic inflammatory response syndrome (SIRS). Both SIRS and sepsis could ultimately progress to multiple organ dysfunction syndrome. In one-third of the patients, however, no primary focus can be found. Multiple organ dysfunction syndrome is well established as the final stage of a continuum: SIRS + infection → sepsis → severe sepsis → Multiple organ dysfunction syndrome.

As of 2006, investigators were studying genetic targets for possible gene therapy to prevent the progression to multiple organ dysfunction syndrome. Some authors have conjectured that the inactivation of the transcription factors NF-κB and AP-1 would be appropriate targets in preventing sepsis and SIRS. These two genes are pro-inflammatory. They are essential components of a normal healthy immune response, however, so there is risk of increasing vulnerability to infection, which can also cause clinical deterioration.

== Pathophysiology ==
A definite explanation has not been found. Local and systemic responses are initiated by tissue damage. Respiratory failure is common in the first 72 hours. Subsequently, one might see liver failure (5–7 days), gastrointestinal bleeding (10–15 days) and kidney failure (11–17 days).

=== Gut hypothesis ===
The most popular hypothesis by Deitch to explain MODS in critically ill patients is the gut hypothesis. Due to splanchnic hypoperfusion and the subsequent mucosal ischaemia there are structural changes and alterations in cellular function. This results in increased gut permeability, changed immune function of the gut and increased translocation of bacteria. Liver dysfunction leads to toxins escaping into the systemic circulation and activating an immune response. This results in tissue injury and organ dysfunction.

=== Endotoxin macrophage hypothesis ===
Gram-negative infections in MODS patients are relatively common, hence endotoxins have been advanced as principal mediator in this disorder. It is thought that following the initial event cytokines are produced and released. The pro-inflammatory mediators are: tumor necrosis factor-alpha (TNF-α), interleukin-1, interleukin-6, thromboxane A2, prostacyclin, platelet activating factor, and nitric oxide.

=== Tissue hypoxia-microvascular hypothesis ===
As a result of macro- and microvascular changes insufficient supply of oxygen occurs. Hypoxemia causes cell death and organ dysfunction.

=== Mitochondrial DNA hypothesis ===
According to findings of Professor Zsolt Balogh and his team at the University of Newcastle (Australia), mitochondrial DNA is the leading cause of severe inflammation due to a massive amount of mitochondrial DNA that leaks into the bloodstream due to cell death of patients who survived major trauma.

Mitochondrial DNA resembles bacterial DNA. If bacteria triggers leukocytes, mitochondrial DNA may do the same. When confronted with bacteria, white blood cells, or neutrophil granulocytes, behave like predatory spiders. They spit out a web, or net, to trap the invaders, then hit them with a deadly oxidative blast, forming neutrophil extracellular traps (NETs).

This results in catastrophic immune response leading to multiple organ dysfunction syndrome.

=== Integrated hypothesis ===
Since in most cases no primary cause is found, the condition could be part of a compromised homeostasis involving the previous mechanisms.

== Diagnosis ==
The European Society of Intensive Care organized a consensus meeting in 1994 to create the "Sepsis-Related Organ Failure Assessment (SOFA)" score to describe and quantitate the degree of organ dysfunction in six organ systems. Using similar physiologic variables the Multiple Organ Dysfunction Score was developed.

Four clinical phases have been suggested:

- Stage 1: the patient has increased volume requirements and mild respiratory alkalosis, which is accompanied by oliguria, hyperglycemia and increased insulin requirements.
- Stage 2: the patient is tachypneic, hypocapnic and hypoxemic; develops moderate liver dysfunction and possible hematologic abnormalities.
- Stage 3: the patient develops shock with azotemia and acid–base disturbances; has significant coagulation abnormalities.
- Stage 4: the patient is vasopressor dependent and oliguric or anuric; subsequently develops ischemic colitis and lactic acidosis.

== Management ==
At present, there is no drug or device that can reverse organ failure that has been judged by the health care team to be medically or surgically irreversible (organ function can recover, at least to a degree, in patients whose organs are very dysfunctional, where the patient has not died; and some organs, like the liver or the skin, can regenerate better than others), with the possible exception of single or multiple organ transplants or the use of artificial organs or organ parts, in certain candidates in specific situations. Therapy, therefore, is usually mostly limited to supportive care, i.e. safeguarding hemodynamics, and respiration. Maintaining adequate tissue oxygenation is a principal target. Starting enteral nutrition within 36 hours of admission to an intensive care unit has reduced infectious complications.

== Prognosis ==
Mortality, though it has lessened to a limited degree, at least in developed countries with timely access to initial and tertiary care, varies where the chance of survival is diminished as the number of organs involved increases. Mortality in MODS from septic shock (which itself has a high mortality of 25–50%), and from multiple traumas, especially if not rapidly treated, appear to be especially severe. If more than one organ system is affected, the mortality rate is still higher, and this is especially the case when five or more systems or organs are affected. Old age is a risk factor in and of itself, and immunocompromised patients, such as with cancer or AIDS or a transplant, are at risk. Prognosis must take into account any co-morbidities the patient may have, their past and current health status, any genetic or environmental vulnerabilities they have, the nature and type of the illness or injury (as an example, data from COVID-19 is still being analyzed, whereas other cases from long-existing illnesses are much better understood), and any resistance to drugs used to treat microbial infections or any hospital-acquired co-infection. Earlier and aggressive treatment, the use of experimental treatments, or at least modern tools such as ventilators, ECMO, dialysis, bypass, and transplantation, especially at a trauma center, may improve outcomes in certain cases, but this depends in part on speedy and affordable access to high-quality care, which many areas lack. Measurements of lactate, cytokines, albumin and other proteins, urea, blood oxygen and carbon dioxide levels, insulin, and blood sugar, adequate hydration, constant monitoring of vital signs, good communication within and between facilities and staff, and adequate staffing, training, and charting are important in MODS, as in any serious illness.

In patients with sepsis, septic shock, or multiple organ dysfunction syndrome that is due to major trauma, the "rs1800625" polymorphism is a functional single nucleotide polymorphism, a part of the receptor for advanced glycation end products (RAGE) transmembrane receptor gene (of the immunoglobulin superfamily) and confers host susceptibility to sepsis and MODS in these patients.

== History ==
For many years, some patients were loosely classified as having sepsis or the sepsis syndrome. In more recent years, these concepts have been refined – so that there are specific definitions of sepsis – and two new concepts have been developed: the SIRS and MODS.

Although Irwin and Rippe cautioned in 2005 that the use of "multiple organ failure" or "multisystem organ failure" should be avoided, both Harrison's (2015) and Cecil's (2012) medical textbooks still use the terms "multi-organ failure" and "multiple organ failure" in several chapters and do not use "multiple organ dysfunction syndrome" at all.
