= Edmund Leser =

German surgeon (1853–1916)

Edmund Leser (1 May 1853, in Münster – 11 December 1916, in Frankfurt am Main) was a German surgeon remembered for describing the Leser-Trélat sign (named with Ulysse Trélat, 1828–1890).

He studied law in Berlin and served in the Franco-Prussian War as an artillery officer before studying medicine in Leipzig. He received his doctorate in 1880 and worked as Richard von Volkmann's assistant in Halle. He qualified as a surgeon in 1884, and became a professor in 1894, practicing in Halle and Frankfurt.

He was the author of Lehrbuch der speciellen Chirurgie in 50 Vorlesungen (Textbook of special surgery in 50 lectures), published in several editions.
