= Anacharsis Baizeau =

Anacharsis Evariste Baizeau
- Born: 3 June 1821; Nantes
- Died: 6 February 1910 (aged 88); Paris
- Occupation: professeur agrégé

Anacharsis Evariste Baizeau (3 June 1821, Nantes – 6 February 1910, Paris) was a French military physician.

During his career he served as a professeur agrégé at Val-de-Grâce, a physician at the military hospital of the Oran division (Algeria), a médecin-inspecteur and as a member of the Conseil des armées.

His name is associated with méthode de Baizeau et Trélat (Baizeau and Trélat's method), an operative procedure used to repair a clefted soft palate, named in conjunction with surgeon Ulysse Trélat (1828–1890).

== Written works ==
- Des causes et du traitement des fièvres intermittentes, (1844) – Causes and treatment of intermittent fever.
- De la Cystite hémorrhagique du col compliquant l'uréthrite, et de son traitement par les balsamiques, (1861). – On hemorrhagic cystitis complicating cervical urethritis, and its treatment with balsamics.
- De l'héméralopie épidémique, (1861) – Epidemic of hemeralopia.
- Mémoire sur les perforations et les divisions de la voûte palatine, (1862) – On the perforations and divisions involving the roof of the mouth.
- Sur la ponction du péricarde, (1868) – On the puncture of the pericardium.
- De la Rupture spontanée de l'ombilic à la suite de péritonite .., (1875) – Spontaneous rupture of the navel with the peritoneum.
