= Skin Cancer: Recognition and Management =

Reference book on skin cancer

- Author: Robert A. Schwartz
- Language: English
- Subject: Medical book
- Publisher: Blackwell Publishing
- Publication date: 2008 (Second edition, hardback)
- Publication place: United States
- Media type: Hardback
- ISBN: 978-1405159616

Skin Cancer: Recognition and Management is a clinical reference by Robert A. Schwartz covering skin and accessible mucosal disorders, premalignant and malignant cutaneous disorders, including melanoma, Kaposi's sarcoma and other sarcomas, cutaneous lymphoma, cutaneous metastatic disease and cutaneous markers of internal malignancy. It emphasizes skin cancer prevention, as well as recent advances in diagnosis and management. It has a chapter exploring dermoscopic evaluation of skin cancer and a chapter on oral cancer.

Critical reception has been positive. Dermatologic Surgery gave a favorable review for the work, writing that it was "nicely illustrated with beautiful color pictures and is extensively referenced." The Journal of the American Medical Association also rated the work highly, calling it "timely and useful".
