= C. E. V. Leser =

German econometrician

Conrad Emanuel Victor Leser (1915–1998) was a German Econometrician.

Leser was born in Heidelberg, Germany. He studied at the University of Zurich, Switzerland from which he held a DPhil. After being forced to leave Germany because of his non-Aryan status he gained an MSc in Economics from the London School of Economics. At the same time he frequented Speakers' Corner near Marble Arch to improve his English. Because of his German origins, Leser was interned in Canada from 1940 to 1941.

After his return to England, Leser held posts at the University of Manchester, in Canberra, Australia and at the Economic and Social Research Institute in Dublin before becoming the first professor of Econometrics at the University of Leeds in 1968. He retired from his chair in 1980 with the title professor Emeritus.

Leser is best known for his work on the Engel curve. He also proposed the Hodrick–Prescott filter.

== External sources ==
- Google Scholar
- IDEAS/RePEc
