= Ulysse Trélat =

French surgeon

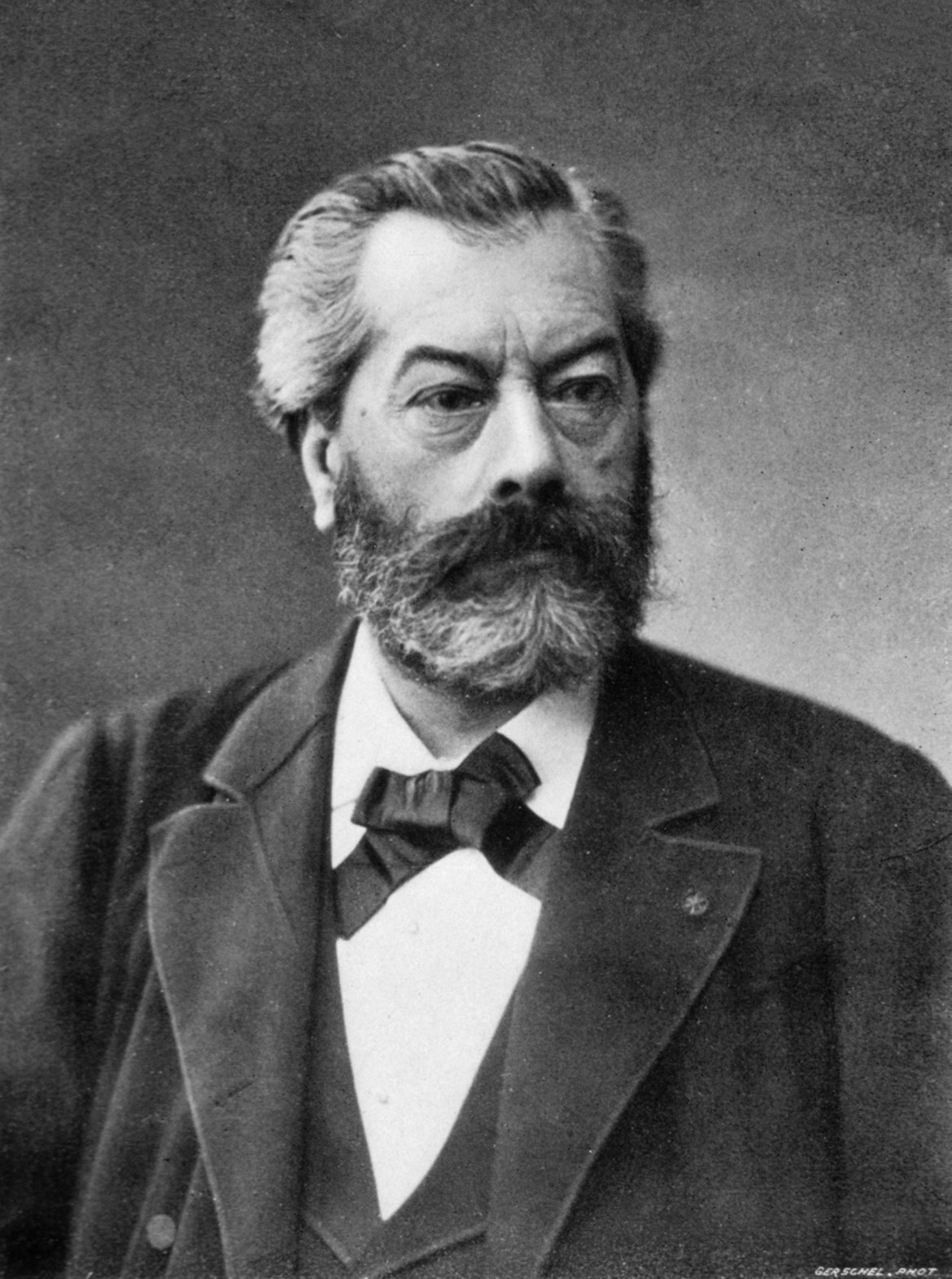
- Born: 13 August 1828; Paris
- Died: 28 March 1890 (aged 61)
- Parent: Ulysse Trélat

Ulysse Trélat (13 August 1828, Paris – 28 March 1890) was a French surgeon remembered for describing the Leser–Trélat sign.

He was the son of an Army physician, also named Ulysse Trélat (1795–1879). He received his education from his father, from Philippe-Frédéric Blandin, Auguste Nélaton and Philibert Joseph Roux. He graduated Doctor of Medicine in 1854, became prosector in 1855 and agrégé in 1857 with a thesis on phossy jaw. He became surgeon in 1860, chief of surgery at Paris Maternité in 1864 and professor of clinical surgery at the Hôpital Necker.

Mandible affected by phossy jaw, 1870-1871 (Sorbonne University)

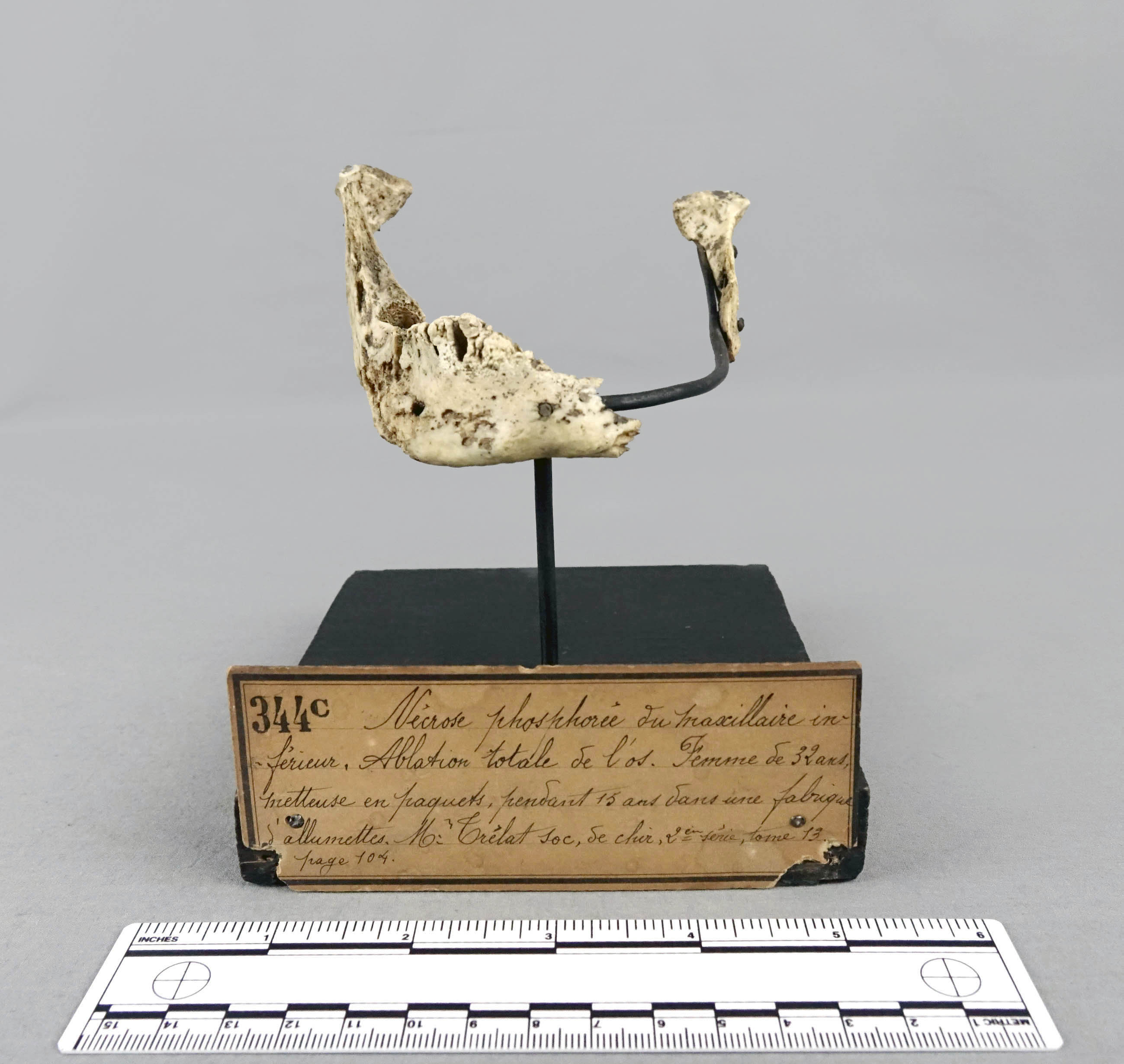

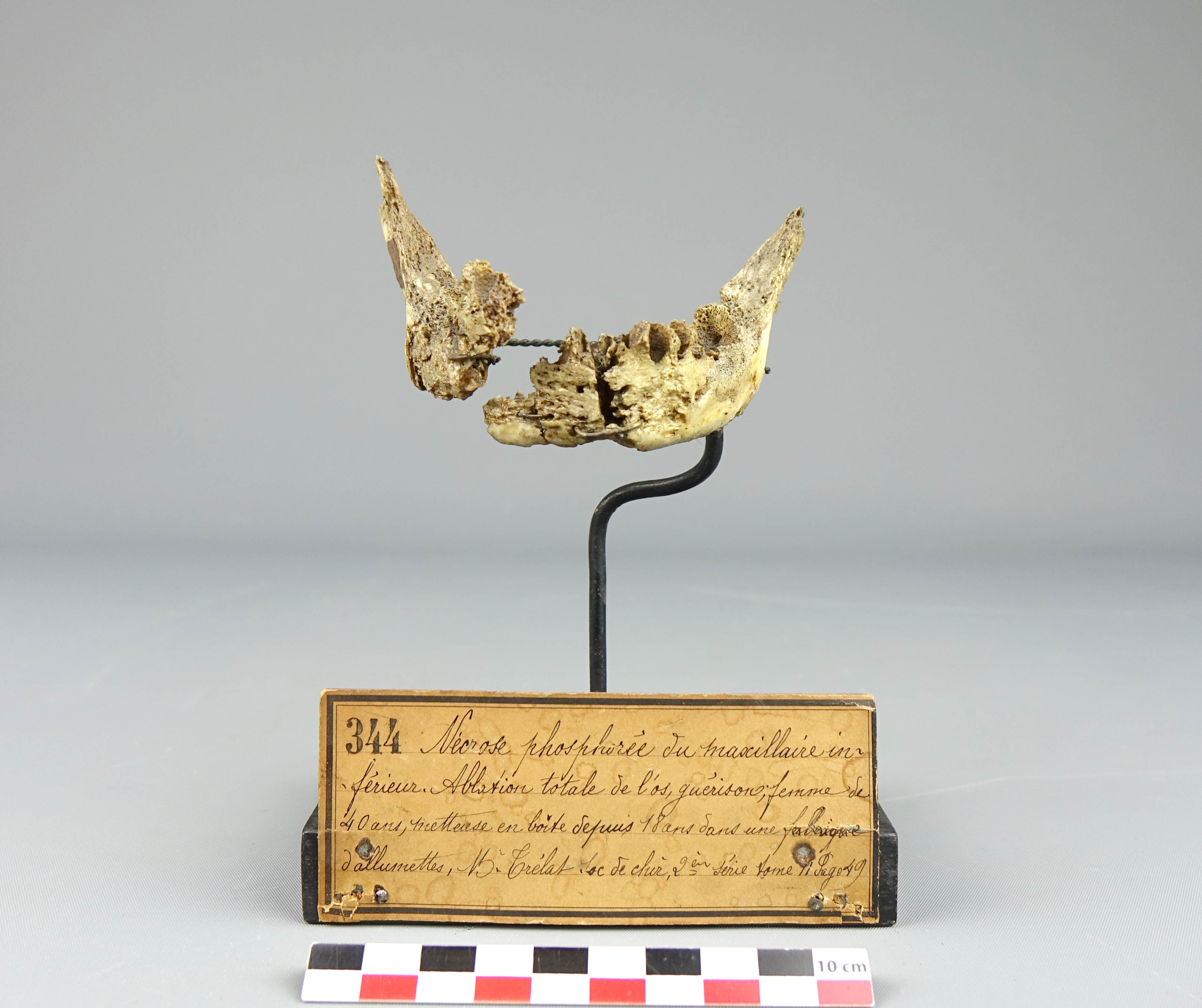

With military physician Anacharsis Baizeau (1821–1910), the eponymous "Baizeau and Trélat's method" is named, which is a surgical procedure for repair of a clefted soft palate. With surgeon Pierre Delbet (1861–1925), he published Clinique chirurgicale (1891).
