= Granulocytosis =

- Specialty: Hematology

In medicine, granulocytosis is the presence of an increased number of granulocytes in the peripheral blood. Often, the word refers to an increased neutrophil granulocyte count (neutrophilia), but granulocytosis formally refers to the combination of neutrophilia, eosinophilia, and basophilia. Leukocytosis refers to an increase in the number of all white blood cells.

== Causes ==
Granulocytosis can be a feature of a number of diseases, including:

- Infection, especially bacterial
- Malignancy, most notably leukemia (it is the main feature of chronic myelogenous leukemia, CML)
- Autoimmune disease

== Diagnosis ==
Diagnosis of granulocytosis is usually done by obtaining a complete blood count.

== Prognostic ==
In cardiovascular disease, increased white blood cell counts have been shown to indicate a worse prognosis.

== See also ==
- Agranulocytosis
- Bandemia
- Complete blood count
