= Bandemia =

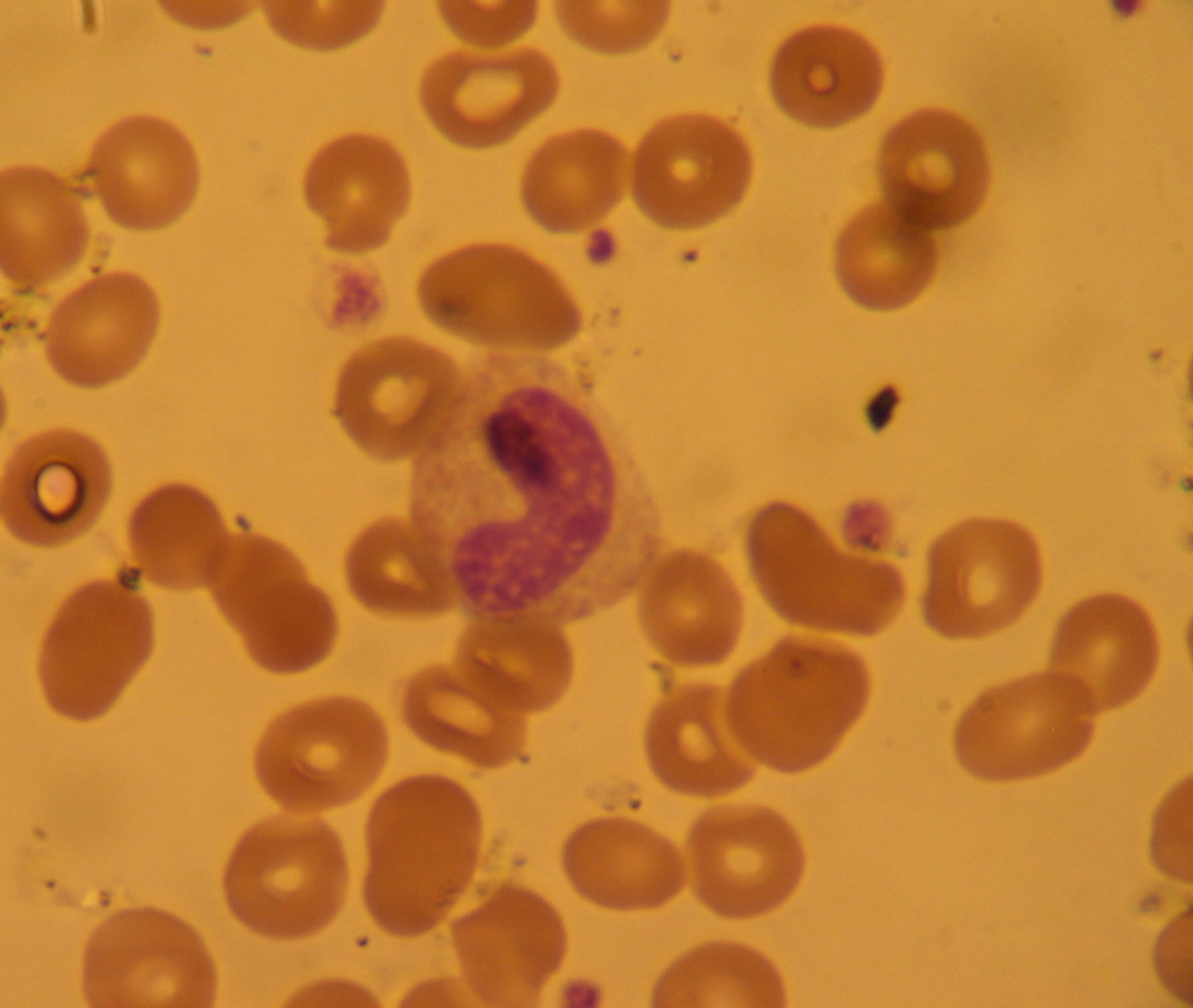
- A band cell shown in a peripheral blood smear. The band cell is the larger cell in the center of the image with a kidney shaped nucleus.
- Specialty: Hematology

Bandemia refers to an excess or increased levels of band cells (immature white blood cells) released by the bone marrow into the blood. It thus overlaps with the concept of left shift—bandemia is a principal type of left shift and many (perhaps most) clinical mentions of the latter refer to instances of this type.

It is a signifier of infection (or sepsis) or inflammation. Measurement of it can play a role in the approach to appendicitis.

== See also ==
- Granulocytosis
