= Paraneoplastic acrokeratosis =

- Other names: Acrokeratosis paraneoplastica of Bazex and Dupre and acrokeratosis paraneoplastica)
- Specialty: Dermatology, oncology

Paraneoplastic acrokeratosis, also known as Basex syndrome, is a skin condition characterized by psoriasiform changes of fingers, toes, ears, and nose, with involvement of the nails and periungual tissues being characteristic and indistinguishable from psoriatic nails. The condition is associated with carcinomas of the upper aerodigestive tract.

== History ==
A case was first reported by Henri Gougerot and C. Grupper in 1922. Andre Bazex described it as a paraneoplastic syndrome in 1965.

== See also ==
- List of cutaneous conditions
- Nail anatomy
- List of cutaneous conditions associated with increased risk of nonmelanoma skin cancer
