= Seborrheic keratosis =

Benign skin tumor originating in keratocytes

- Other names: Seborrheic verruca, basal cell papilloma, senile wart
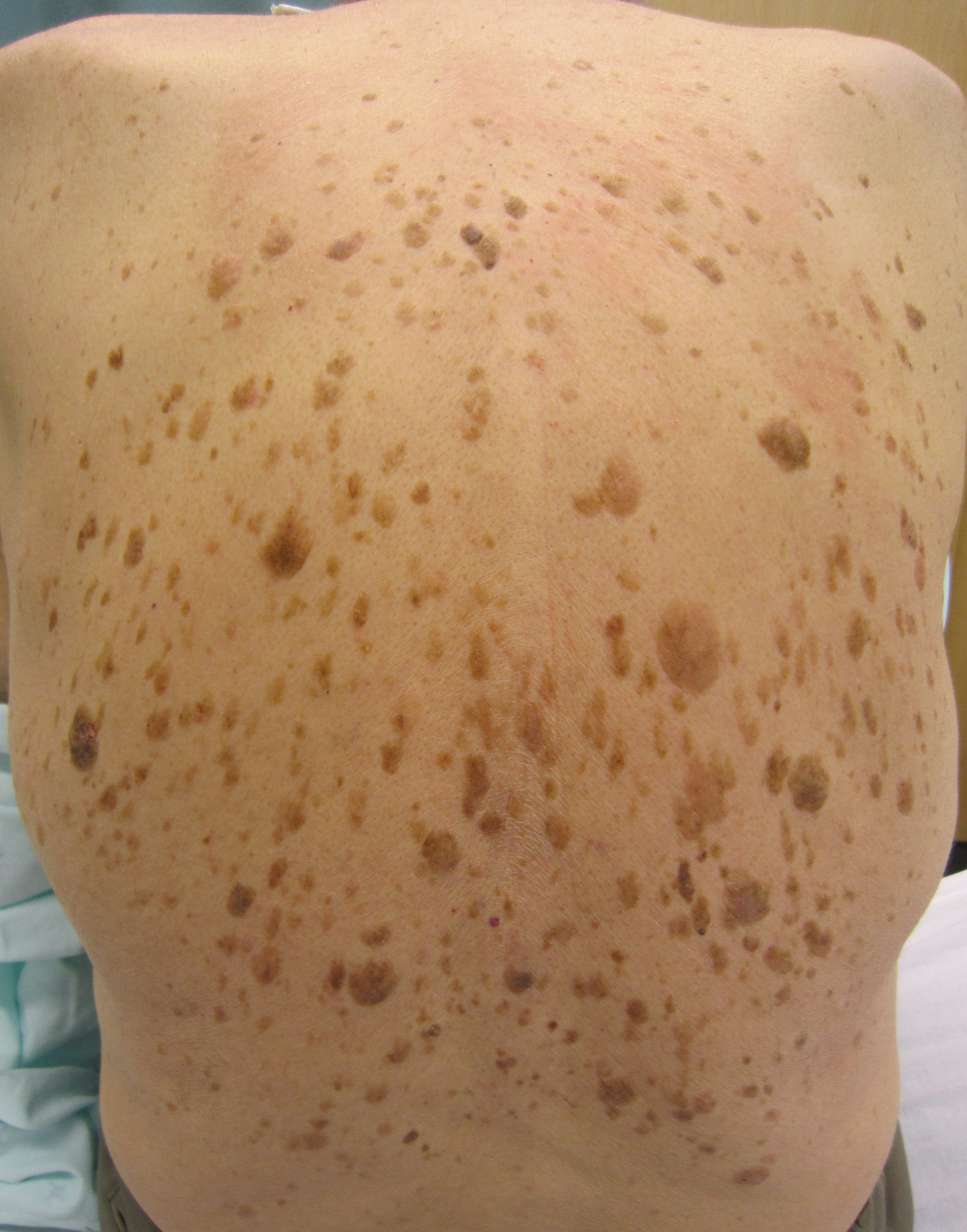
- Multiple seborrheic keratoses on the back of a patient with Leser–Trélat sign
- Specialty: Dermatology
- Diagnostic method: Based on clinical examination, skin biopsy
- Treatment: Electrodesiccation and curettage, cryotherapy

A seborrheic keratosis is a non-cancerous (benign) skin tumor that originates from cells, namely keratinocytes, in the outer layer of the skin called the epidermis. Like liver spots, seborrheic keratoses are seen more often as people age.

The tumors (also called lesions) appear in various colors, from light tan to black. They are round or oval, feel flat or slightly elevated, like the scab from a healing wound, and range in size from very small to more than 2.5 centimetres (1 in) across. They are often associated with other skin conditions, including basal cell carcinoma. Sometimes, seborrheic keratosis and basal cell carcinoma occur at the same location. At clinical examination, a differential diagnosis considers warts and melanomas. Because only the top layers of the epidermis are involved, seborrheic keratoses are often described as having a "pasted-on" appearance. Some dermatologists refer to seborrheic keratoses as "seborrheic warts", because they resemble warts, but strictly speaking, the term "warts" refers to lesions that are caused by the human papillomavirus.

== Cause ==
The cause of seborrheic keratosis is not known. The only definitive association is that its prevalence increases with age.

== Diagnosis ==
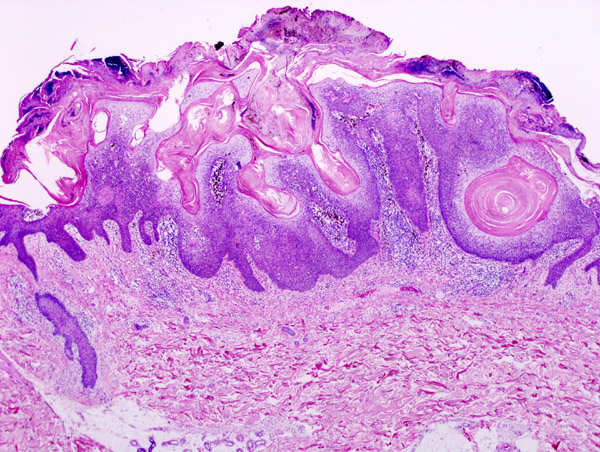
Micrograph of a seborrheic keratosis (H&E stain, scanning magnification)

Visual diagnosis is made by the "stuck on" appearance, horny pearls or cysts embedded in the structure. Darkly pigmented lesions can be challenging to distinguish from nodular melanomas. Furthermore, thin seborrheic keratoses on facial skin can be very difficult to differentiate from lentigo maligna even with dermatoscopy. Clinically, epidermal nevi are similar to seborrheic keratoses in appearance. Epidermal nevi are usually present at or near birth. Condylomas and warts can clinically resemble seborrheic keratoses, and dermatoscopy can be helpful to differentiate them. On the penis and genital skin, condylomas and seborrheic keratoses can be difficult to differentiate, even on biopsy.

A study examining over 4,000 biopsied skin lesions identified clinically as seborrheic keratoses showed 3.1% were malignancies. Two-thirds of those were squamous cell carcinoma. To date, the gold standard in the diagnosis of seborrheic keratosis is represented by the histolopathologic analysis of a skin biopsy.

=== Subtypes ===
Seborrheic keratoses may be divided into the following types:

Subtype (and alternative names)	Characteristics	Image
Common seborrheic keratosis (basal cell papilloma, solid seborrheic keratosis)	Dull or lackluster surface.	
Reticulated seborrheic keratosis (adenoid seborrheic keratosis)	Dull or lackluster surface, and with keratin cysts seen histologically.	
Stucco keratosis (deratosis alba, digitate seborrheic keratosis, hyperkeratotic seborrheic keratosis, serrated seborrheic keratosis, verrucous seborrheic keratosis)	Common. Dull or lackluster surface, and with church-spire-like projections of epidermal cells around collagen seen histologically. Stucco keratoses are often light brown to off-white, and are no larger than a few millimeters in diameter. They are often found on the distal tibia, ankle, and foot.	
Clonal seborrheic keratosis	Dull or lackluster surface, and with round, loosely packed nests of cells seen histologically.	
Irritated seborrheic keratosis (inflamed seborrheic keratosis, basosquamous cell acanthoma)	Dull or lackluster surface.	
Seborrheic keratosis with squamous atypia	Dull or lackluster surface, and with round, loosely packed nests of cells seen histologically.	
Melanoacanthoma (pigmented seborrheic keratosis)	Dull or lackluster surface. It involves a proliferation of keratinocytes and melanocytes.	
Inverted follicular keratosis (Note: Inverted follicular keratosis is generally thought to be a rare variant of seborrheic keratosis, but this position is not universally accepted.: Karadag A, Ozlu E, Uzuncakmak T, et al. (2016). "Inverted follicular keratosis successfully treated with imiquimod". Indian Dermatology Online Journal. 7 (3): 177–9. doi:10.4103/2229-5178.182354. PMC 4886589. PMID 27294052.)	Asymptomatic, firm, white–tan to pink papules Microscopically it is characterized as a well-circumscribed inverted acanthotic squamous proliferation containing squamous eddies and without significant atypia.	

=== Differential diagnoses ===
Dermatosis papulosa nigra (DPN) is a condition of many small, benign skin lesions on the face, a condition generally presenting on darker-skinned individuals. DPN is extremely common, affecting up to 30% of black people in the United States.

== Treatment ==
Medical reasons for removing seborrheic keratoses include irritation and bleeding. They may also be removed for cosmetic reasons. Generally, lesions can be treated with electrodesiccation and curettage, or cryosurgery. When correctly performed, removal of seborrheic keratoses will not cause much visible scarring.

== Epidemiology ==
Seborrheic keratosis is the most common benign skin tumor. Incidence increases with age. There is less prevalence in people with darker skin. In large-cohort studies, all patients aged 50 and older had at least one seborrheic keratosis. Onset is usually in middle age, although they are common in younger patients too, as they are found in 12% of 15-year-olds to 25-year-olds, which makes the term "senile keratosis" a misnomer.

== See also ==
- The sign of Leser-Trélat
