= International Journal of Dermatology =

- Discipline: Dermatology
- Language: English
- Edited by: Rokea A. el-Azhary

Publication details
- History: 1963-present
- Publisher: Wiley-Blackwell on behalf of the International Society of Dermatology
- Frequency: Monthly
- Open access: Hybrid journal
- Impact factor: 3.6 (2022)

Standard abbreviations
- ISO 4: Int. J. Dermatol.

Indexing
- ISSN: 1365-4632

Links
- Journal homepage; Online archive

The International Journal of Dermatology is a peer-reviewed monthly journal covering all aspects of dermatology. According to the Journal Citation Reports, the journal has a 2022 impact factor of 3.6. The journal is indexed in Current Contents, Index Medicus, and the Science Citation Index.
