= Acanthosis nigricans =

Darkening of the skin around bodily folds

- Acanthosis nigricans on the armpit
- Specialty: Dermatology

Acanthosis nigricans is a cutaneous finding characterized by brown-to-black, velvety hyperpigmentation of the skin, most often affecting body folds such as the posterior neck, axillae, groin and umbilicus. It is strongly associated with insulin resistance and hyperinsulinaemia, including in type 2 diabetes and metabolic syndrome. Excess insulin activates insulin and insulin-like growth factor signalling pathways, stimulating proliferation of keratinocytes and fibroblasts and producing the characteristic plaques.

Acanthosis nigricans may also occur in hereditary syndromes, as a reaction to medications, or as a paraneoplastic syndrome associated with internal malignancy. In children, it is an important clinical marker of metabolic and cardiometabolic risk.

== Signs and symptoms ==
Acanthosis nigricans presents as hyperpigmented, velvety plaques with poorly defined borders. Common sites include:

- posterior and lateral neck folds
- axillae
- groin and genitals
- umbilicus
- elbows and knees
- forehead, periorbital and perioral areas

Lesions are usually asymptomatic, though mild pruritus may occur.

== Causes ==
Acanthosis nigricans arises from several distinct mechanisms. It most commonly reflects insulin resistance and is frequently associated with type 2 diabetes, obesity and endocrine disorders such as hypothyroidism, acromegaly, polyendocrine metabolic ovarian syndrome, and Cushing's disease. It may also be inherited, medication-related or associated with internal malignancy. Review articles describe acanthosis nigricans primarily as a marker of systemic metabolic dysfunction rather than a primary skin disease.

=== Acral acanthotic anomaly ===
Acral acanthotic anomaly is a localized variant affecting the elbows, knees, knuckles and dorsal feet. It occurs in otherwise healthy individuals, and its etiology is unknown. It is not associated with internal disease.

=== Familial (Type I) ===
Familial acanthosis nigricans is an autosomal dominant condition presenting at birth or during childhood.

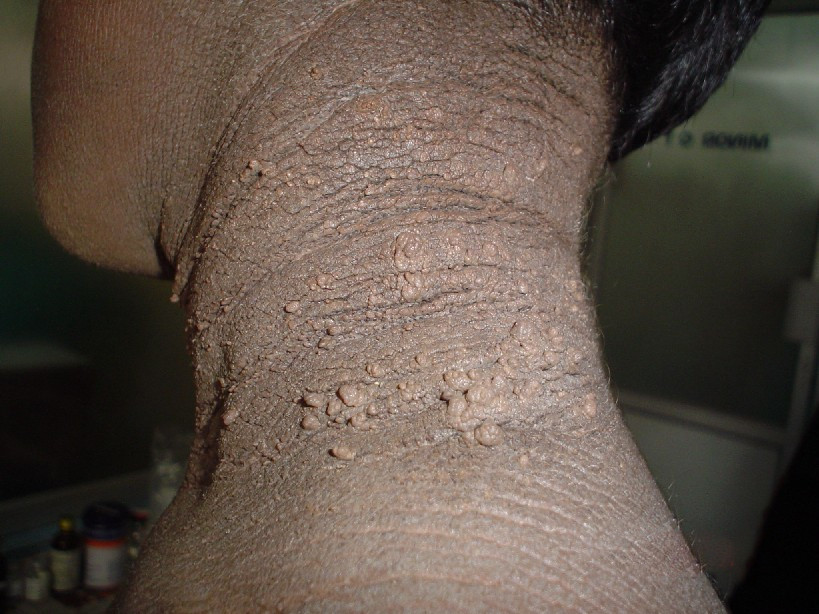
Familial acanthosis nigricans

=== Endocrine (Type II) ===
Endocrine-associated acanthosis nigricans occurs in metabolic or hormonal disorders that alter glucose or androgen levels.

Common associated conditions include:

- marked insulin resistance (diabetes mellitus, metabolic syndrome)
- androgen excess (acromegaly, Cushing's disease, polyendocrine metabolic ovarian syndrome)
- Addison's disease and hypothyroidism
- rare syndromes including Alström syndrome, Prader–Willi syndrome, Donohue syndrome, pinealoma, lipoatrophic diabetes, pituitary basophilism, pineal hyperplasia, ovarian hyperthecosis, stromal luteoma and ovarian dermoid cysts

This form usually has a gradual onset and often occurs in people who are also obese.

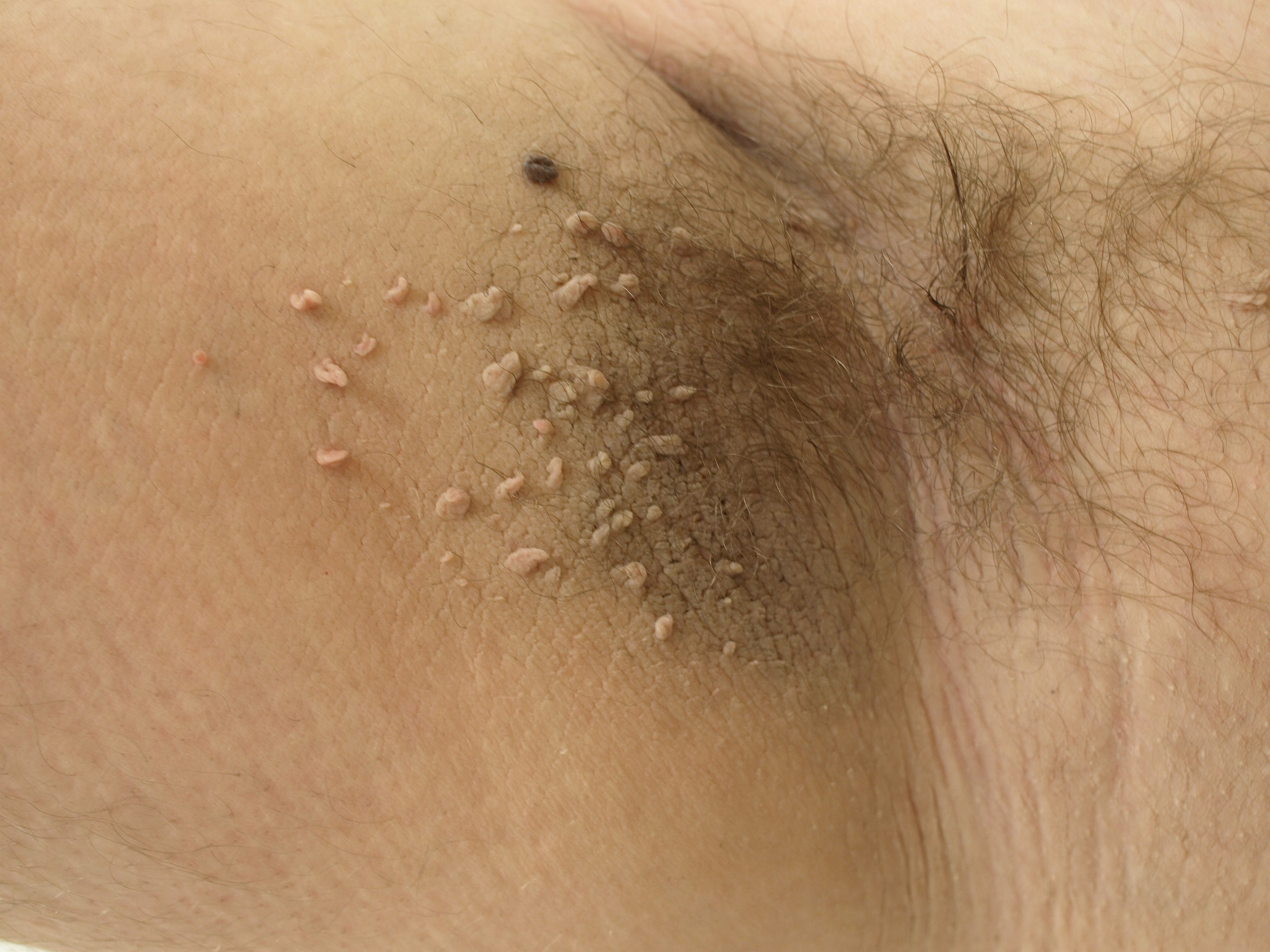
Skin tags (acrochordons), which may accompany endocrine-associated AN

=== Malignancy (Type V) ===
Malignant acanthosis nigricans is a paraneoplastic syndrome most often associated with gastrointestinal adenocarcinomas, particularly gastric cancer. Less commonly, it occurs with malignancies of the breast, ovary, prostate, thyroid, lung or lymphoid tissues.

It may precede, accompany or follow a cancer diagnosis. Mucosal involvement is more common than in benign forms. Additional findings may include multiple seborrhoeic keratoses, skin tags and tripe palms.

=== Obesity and pseudoacanthosis nigricans (Type III) ===
In young people, acanthosis nigricans is a visible marker of insulin resistance. Elevated insulin stimulates epidermal proliferation. Insulin resistance syndromes may be classified as type A (HAIR-AN) or type B.

Most cases are obesity-associated and otherwise idiopathic. This pattern is more common in darker-skinned individuals and is sometimes termed pseudoacanthosis nigricans.

Facial involvement may appear as a horizontal forehead band or as periorbital or perioral hyperpigmentation.

=== Pediatric associations ===
In children and adolescents, acanthosis nigricans commonly co-occurs with overweight and obesity and functions as a clinical marker of insulin resistance and increased cardiometabolic risk. Longitudinal studies show higher rates of subsequent metabolic syndrome. Cross-sectional studies link acanthosis nigricans with low serum 25-hydroxyvitamin D levels.

=== Drug-related (Type IV) ===
Medications associated with acanthosis nigricans include nicotinic acid, glucocorticoids, combined oral contraceptives and growth hormone therapy. A systematic review has reported additional agents, including insulin, hormonal therapies, antineoplastic medications and certain biologics.

== Pathophysiology ==
Acanthosis nigricans results from activation of growth factor receptor pathways, most commonly insulin-mediated stimulation of insulin-like growth factor receptor on keratinocytes and fibroblasts. Hyperinsulinaemia may also displace IGF-1 from its binding proteins, amplifying epidermal proliferation.

Contributing mechanisms include:

- insulin and IGF-1 driven proliferation of keratinocytes and fibroblasts
- fibroblast growth factor receptor abnormalities in hereditary forms
- transforming growth factor-α overexpression in malignancy-associated cases, activating the epidermal growth factor receptor

Sweat, friction and occlusion may accentuate lesion development in predisposed areas.

== Diagnosis ==
Acanthosis nigricans is typically diagnosed clinically based on its characteristic velvety hyperpigmentation and distribution. A skin biopsy is rarely needed but, when performed, shows hyperkeratosis, papillomatosis and mild basal hyperpigmentation.

Evaluation aims to identify associated conditions. Investigations may include:

- fasting glucose or HbA1c
- thyroid function tests
- androgen measurements, when indicated
- endoscopy or imaging when malignancy is suspected

== Classification ==
A conventional clinical distinction separates:

- Benign acanthosis nigricans: obesity-related, endocrine-associated, hereditary and drug-induced forms
- Malignant acanthosis nigricans: associated with internal malignancy, particularly gastrointestinal adenocarcinoma

A broader classification proposed in 1994 groups acanthosis nigricans into benign, malignant, obesity-associated, drug-induced, acral, unilateral and mixed or syndromic variants.

== Treatment ==
Management of acanthosis nigricans (AN) generally involves evaluating for and addressing any associated underlying condition rather than treating the skin changes alone. When AN occurs in the setting of obesity, insulin resistance or type 2 diabetes mellitus, improvement in metabolic status may be followed by gradual softening or lightening of the lesions, although the degree of change varies.

Drug-induced AN may improve after reduction or discontinuation of the causative medication when clinically appropriate. Reported associations include systemic corticosteroids, high-dose nicotinic acid and certain hormonal therapies.

In malignancy-associated AN, particularly that linked to gastrointestinal adenocarcinomas, regression of the cutaneous changes has been observed following treatment of the underlying tumour, though this is not universal. Sudden onset, rapid progression or mucosal involvement have been described in malignant forms and may prompt further evaluation.

=== Topical and procedural therapies ===
Topical therapies are used mainly for cosmetic reasons. Small clinical studies have reported improvement with topical retinoids, urea preparations and other keratolytic agents, although evidence remains limited and results vary among individuals. Topical treatment does not modify the underlying cause of AN.

Procedural interventions, including fractional carbon dioxide (CO_{2}) laser and various chemical peels, have been explored in pilot studies and small comparative trials. A randomized controlled trial involving 38 participants reported that fractional CO_{2} laser resulted in greater reduction of lesion severity compared with retinoic-acid peel; however, the study was short-term and limited in size. Procedural therapies generally require specialised equipment, and availability and cost may limit use.

=== Systemic therapies ===
Because many cases of AN are associated with metabolic dysfunction, improvement in weight or insulin sensitivity may coincide with changes in the skin. Metformin, which is widely used for insulin resistance and type 2 diabetes, has been reported in case series and observational studies to coincide with improvement in AN; however, high-quality randomized trials with AN as a primary outcome are not available.

Glucagon-like peptide-1 (GLP-1) receptor agonists, used for obesity and diabetes, have also been associated with improvement in some individuals with AN in observational reports, likely secondary to changes in metabolic status. These medications are not used specifically to treat AN, and evidence remains indirect.

== Prognosis ==
The prognosis depends on the underlying cause. Obesity- and insulin resistance–related forms often improve with weight loss and metabolic control. Drug-induced cases typically resolve with withdrawal of the causative agent. Hereditary variants may persist. Malignancy-associated acanthosis nigricans may regress following tumour treatment.

== History ==
Acanthosis nigricans was first described by Paul Gerson Unna in 1889.

== Epidemiology ==
Acanthosis nigricans is reported worldwide, with prevalence varying by age, ethnicity and underlying metabolic risk. In clinic- and community-based samples of people with obesity and insulin resistance, reported prevalence ranges from about 7% to over 70%, depending on the population and diagnostic criteria used.

Higher rates are consistently observed among individuals of African, Hispanic/Latino, Native American and some Asian ancestries, reflecting both genetic susceptibility and a higher burden of obesity and metabolic syndrome in many of these populations. In children and adolescents, the prevalence of acanthosis nigricans has risen alongside increasing rates of overweight and obesity and is common in pediatric cohorts with insulin resistance or metabolic syndrome.

Across studies, acanthosis nigricans is more frequent among people with higher body mass index, increased waist circumference and biochemical markers of insulin resistance.
