= Paraneoplastic syndrome =

Medical effects of tumors besides mass effect

- Specialty: Oncology
- Frequency: Rare

A paraneoplastic syndrome is a syndrome (a set of signs and symptoms) that is the consequence of a tumor in the body (usually a cancerous one). It is specifically due to the production of chemical signaling molecules (such as hormones or cytokines) by tumor cells or by an immune response against the tumor. Unlike a mass effect, it is not due to the local presence of cancer cells.

Paraneoplastic syndromes are typical among middle-aged to older people, and they most commonly occur with cancers of the lung, breast, ovaries or lymphatic system (a lymphoma). Sometimes, the symptoms of paraneoplastic syndromes show before the diagnosis of a malignancy, which has been hypothesized to relate to the disease pathogenesis. In this paradigm, tumor cells express tissue-restricted antigens (e.g., neuronal proteins), triggering an anti-tumor immune response which may be partially or, rarely, completely effective in suppressing tumor growth and symptoms. Patients then come to clinical attention when this tumor immune response breaks immune tolerance and begins to attack the normal tissue expressing that (e.g., neuronal) protein.

The abbreviation PNS is sometimes used for paraneoplastic syndrome, although it is used more often to refer to the peripheral nervous system.

== Signs and symptoms ==
Symptomatic features of paraneoplastic syndrome cultivate in four ways: endocrine, neurological, mucocutaneous, and hematological. The most common presentation is a fever (release of endogenous pyrogens often related to lymphokines or tissue pyrogens), but the overall picture will often include several clinical cases observed which may specifically simulate more common benign conditions.

=== Endocrine ===
The following diseases manifest by means of endocrine dysfunction: Cushing syndrome, syndrome of inappropriate antidiuretic hormone, hypercalcemia, hypoglycemia, carcinoid syndrome, and hyperaldosteronism.

=== Neurological ===
The following diseases manifest by means of neurological dysfunction: Lambert–Eaton myasthenic syndrome, paraneoplastic cerebellar degeneration, encephalomyelitis, limbic encephalitis, brainstem encephalitis, opsoclonus myoclonus ataxia syndrome, anti-NMDA receptor encephalitis, and polymyositis.

=== Mucocutaneous ===
The following diseases manifest by means of mucocutaneous dysfunction: acanthosis nigricans, dermatomyositis, Leser-Trélat sign, necrolytic migratory erythema, Sweet's syndrome, Florid cutaneous papillomatosis, pyoderma gangrenosum, and acquired generalized hypertrichosis. Mucocutaneous dysfunctions of paraneoplastic syndromes can be seen in cases of itching (hypereosinophilia), immune system depression (latent varicella-zoster virus in sensory ganglia), pancreatic tumors (leading to adipose nodular necrosis of subcutaneous tissues), flushes (prostaglandin secretions), and even dermic melanosis (cannot be eliminated via urine and results in grey to black-blueish skin tones).

=== Hematological ===
The following diseases manifest by means of hematological dysfunction: granulocytosis, polycythemia, Trousseau sign, nonbacterial thrombotic endocarditis, and anemia. Hematological dysfunction of paraneoplastic syndromes can be seen from an increase of erythropoietin (EPO), which may occur in response to hypoxia or ectopic EPO production/altered catabolism. Erythrocytosis is common in regions of the liver, kidney, adrenal glands, lung, thymus, and central nervous system (as well as gynecological tumors and myosarcomas).

=== Other ===
The following diseases manifest by means of physiological dysfunction besides the categories above: membranous glomerulonephritis, tumor-induced osteomalacia, Stauffer syndrome, Neoplastic fever, and thymoma-associated multiorgan autoimmunity. Rheumatologic (hypertrophic osteoarthropathy), renal (secondary kidney amyloidosis and sedimentation of the immunocomplexes in nephrons), and gastrointestinal (production of molecules that affect the motility and secretory activity of the digestive tract) dysfunctions, for example, may relate to paraneoplastic syndromes.

== Mechanism ==
The mechanism for a paraneoplastic syndrome varies from case to case. However, pathophysiological outcomes usually arise when a tumor does. Paraneoplastic syndrome often occurs alongside associated cancers as a result of an activated immune system. In this scenario, the body may produce antibodies to fight off the tumor by directly binding and destroying the tumor cell. Paraneoplastic disorders may arise in that antibodies would cross-react with normal tissues and destroy them.

== Diagnosis ==
Diagnostic testing in a possible paraneoplastic syndrome depends on the symptoms and the suspected underlying cancer.

Diagnosis may be difficult in patients in whom paraneoplastic antibodies cannot be detected. In the absence of these antibodies, other tests that may be helpful include MRI, PET, lumbar puncture and electrophysiology.

=== Types ===
Syndrome class	Syndrome	Main causal cancers	Causal mechanism
Endocrine
Endocrine	Cushing syndrome	small-cell lung cancer; Pancreatic carcinoma; Neural tumors; Thymoma	Ectopic ACTH and ACTH-like substance
Endocrine	Syndrome of inappropriate antidiuretic hormone	Small-cell lung cancer; CNS malignancies	Antidiuretic hormone
Endocrine	Hypercalcemia	Lung cancer (typically squamous cell); Breast carcinoma; Renal and bladder carcinoma; Multiple myeloma (may occur independent of osteolytic lesions); Adult T cell leukemia/lymphoma; Ovarian carcinoma; Squamous cell carcinoma (e.g., lung, head, neck, esophageus)	PTHrP (Parathyroid hormone-related protein), TGF-α, TNF, IL-1
Endocrine	Hypoglycemia	Fibrosarcoma; Other mesenchymal sarcomas; Insulinoma; Hepatocellular carcinoma	Insulin or insulin-like substance or "big" IGF-II
Endocrine	Carcinoid syndrome	Bronchial adenoma (carcinoid type); Pancreatic carcinoma; Gastric carcinoma	Serotonin, bradykinin
Endocrine	Hyperaldosteronism	Adrenal adenoma / Conn's syndrome; Non-Hodgkin's lymphoma; Ovarian carcinoma; Pulmonary	Aldosterone
Neurological	Lambert–Eaton myasthenic syndrome	Small-cell lung cancer	Immunologic
Neurological	Paraneoplastic cerebellar degeneration	Lung cancer; Ovarian cancer; Breast carcinoma; Hodgkin's lymphoma	
Neurological	Encephalomyelitis		Inflammation of the brain and spinal cord
Neurological	Limbic encephalitis	Small-cell lung carcinoma	
Neurological	Brainstem encephalitis	Lung cancer; Testicular cancer	Antineuronal antibodies (anti-Hu, anti-Ri, and anti-Ma2). Some forms are amenable to immunotherapy while others are not.
Neurological	Opsoclonus myoclonus ataxia syndrome	Breast carcinoma; Ovarian carcinoma; Small-cell lung carcinoma; Neuroblastoma (in children)	Autoimmune reaction against the RNA-binding protein Nova-1
Neurological	Anti-NMDA receptor encephalitis	Teratoma	Autoimmune reaction against NMDA-receptor subunits
Neurological	Polymyositis	Non-Hodgkin lymphoma; Lung cancer; Bladder cancer	
Mucocutaneous	Acanthosis nigricans	Gastric carcinoma; Lung carcinoma; Uterine carcinoma	Immunologic; Secretion of epidermal growth factor
Mucocutaneous	Dermatomyositis	Bronchogenic carcinoma; Breast carcinoma; Ovarian cancer; Pancreatic cancer; Stomach cancer; Colorectal cancer; Non-Hodgkin lymphoma	Immunologic
Mucocutaneous	Leser-Trélat sign		
Mucocutaneous	Necrolytic migratory erythema	Glucagonoma	
Mucocutaneous	Sweet's syndrome		
Mucocutaneous	Florid cutaneous papillomatosis		
Mucocutaneous	Pyoderma gangrenosum		
Mucocutaneous	Acquired generalized hypertrichosis		
Hematological	Granulocytosis		G-CSF
Hematological	Polycythemia	Renal carcinoma; Cerebellar hemangioma; Hepatocellular carcinoma	Erythropoietin
Hematological	Trousseau sign	Pancreatic carcinoma; Bronchogenic carcinoma	Mucins that activate clotting, others
Hematological	Nonbacterial thrombotic endocarditis	Advanced cancers	Hypercoagulability
Hematological	Anemia	Thymic neoplasms	Unknown
Others	Membranous glomerulonephritis	Various	Tumor antigens; Immune complexes
Others	Tumor-induced osteomalacia	Hemangiopericytoma; Phosphaturic mesenchymal tumor	Fibroblast growth factor 23
Others	Stauffer syndrome	Renal cell carcinoma	
Others	Neoplastic fever		
Others	Thymoma-associated multiorgan autoimmunity	Thymoma	A mechanism similar to that of Graft-versus-host disease

A specifically devastating form of (neurological) paraneoplastic syndromes is a group of disorders classified as paraneoplastic neurological disorders (PNDs). These PNDs affect the central or peripheral nervous system; some are degenerative, though others (such as LEMS) may improve with treatment of the condition or the tumor. Symptoms of PNDs may include difficulty with walking and balance, dizziness, rapid uncontrolled eye movements, difficulty swallowing, loss of muscle tone, loss of fine motor coordination, slurred speech, memory loss, vision problems, sleep disturbances, dementia, seizures, and sensory loss in the limbs.

The most common cancers associated with PNDs are breast, ovarian, and lung cancers, but many other cancers can produce paraneoplastic symptoms, as well.

The root cause is extremely difficult to identify for paraneoplastic syndrome, as there are so many ways the disease can manifest (which may eventually lead to cancer). Ideas may relate to age-related diseases (unable to handle environmental or physical stress in combination with genetic pre-dispositions), accumulation of damaged biomolecules (damages signaling pathways in various regions of the body), increased oxygen free radicals in the body (alters metabolic processes in various regions of the body), etc..

However, prophylactic efforts include routine checks with physicians (particularly those that specialize in neurology and oncology) especially when a patient notices subtle changes in his or her own body.

== Treatment ==
Treatment options include:

1. Therapies to eliminate the underlying cancer, such as chemotherapy, radiation and surgery.
2. Therapies to reduce or slow neurological degeneration. In this scenario, rapid diagnosis and treatment are critical for the patient to have the best chance of recovery. Since these disorders are relatively rare, few doctors have seen or treated paraneoplastic neurological disorders (PNDs). Therefore, PND patients should consult with a specialist with experience in diagnosing and treating paraneoplastic neurological disorders.

A specific prognosis for those with paraneoplastic syndromes links to each unique case presented. Thus, prognosis for paraneoplastic syndromes may vary greatly. For example, paraneoplastic pemphigus often included infection as a major cause of death. Paraneoplastic pemphigus is one of the three major subtypes that affects IgG autoantibodies that are characteristically raised against desmoglein 1 and desmoglein 3 (which are cell-cell adhesion molecules found in desmosomes). Underlying cancer or irreversible system impairment, seen in acute heart failure or kidney failure, may result in death as well.

== Research directions ==
Prostate cancer is the second most common urological malignancy to be associated with paraneoplastic syndromes after renal cell carcinoma. Paraneoplastic syndromes of this nature tend to occur in the setting of late stage and aggressive tumors with poor overall outcomes (endocrine manifestations, neurological entities, dermatological conditions, and other syndromes). A vast majority of prostate cancer cases (over 70%) document paraneoplastic syndrome as a major clinical manifestation of prostate cancer; and (under 20%), the syndrome as an initial sign of disease progression to the castrate-resistant state. Urologist researchers identify serum markers that are associated with the syndrome in order to specific what type of therapies may work most effectively.

Paraneoplastic neurological syndromes may be related immune checkpoint inhibitors (ICIs), one of the underlying causes in inflammatory central nervous system diseases (CNS). The central idea around such research pinpoints treatment strategies to combat cancer related outcomes in the clinical arena, specifically ICIs. Research suggests that patients who are treated with ICIs are more susceptible to CNS disease (since the mechanism of ICIs induces adverse effects on the CNS due to augmented immune responses and neurotoxicity). The purpose of this exploration was to shed light on immunotherapies and distinguishing between neurotoxicity and brain metastasis in the early stages of treatment. In other research, scientists have found that paraneoplastic peripheral nerve disorders (autoantibodies linked to multifocal motor neuropathy) may provide important clinical manifestations. This is especially important for patients who experience inflammatory neuropathies since solid tumors are often associated with peripheral nerve disorders. CV2 autoantibodies, which target dihydropyriminase-related protein 5 (DRP5, or CRMP5) are also associated with a variety of paraneoplastic neurological syndromes, including sensorimotor polyneuropathies. Patients undergoing immune therapies or tumor removal respond very well to antibodies that target CASPR2 (to treat nerve hyperexcitability and neuromyotonia).
