= Anti-VGKC-complex encephalitis =

- Specialty: Neurology

Anti-VGKC-complex encephalitis are caused by antibodies against the voltage gated potassium channel-complex (VGKC-complex) and are implicated in several autoimmune conditions including limbic encephalitis, epilepsy and neuromyotonia (i.e. Isaacs' Syndrome).

Research into autoimmune encephalitides have significantly advanced recently. Both tumour associated (paraneoplastic) and nonparaneoplastic conditions are recognized. Different antibodies are more or less selective for different parts of the brain. Antibodies target intracellular antigens in classic paraneoplastic syndromes, but synaptic proteins in nonparaneoplastic conditions. VGKC-complex autoimmune encephalitis is an example of the latter form.

Antibodies directed against VGKC were first reported in neuromyotonia. Further studies led to VGKC antibodies being recognized in Morvan’s syndrome and limbic encephalitis as well. It was for many years erroneously presumed that antibodies detected in a VGKC assay were targeted against the channel itself. But the heterogeneous presentation of patients was difficult to explain. The original assays for the detection of VGKC antibodies used Iodine-125 labelled dendrotoxin and the relatively mild detergent 2% digitonin on mammalian brain homogenate, and VGKC with complexed proteins was extracted. Co-precipitated proteins would thus also be detected in this assay. It’s now acknowledged that most VGKC antibodies are instead directed towards associated/complexed proteins. In a particular study of 96 patients with VGKC antibodies detected with the radioimmunoprecipitation assay, only 3 (3%) had antibodies towards the Kv1 subunit of the VGKC channel, 55 (57%) had antibodies against Leucine-rich, glioma Inactivated 1 (LGI1), 19 had antibodies reacting with Contactin-associated protein 2 (CASPR 2), 5 had antibodies against Contactin-2 and 18 (19%) had antibodies with unknown specificity. Of the patients with Contactin-2 antibodies, 4/5 had antibodies against other antigens as well.

== Signs and symptoms ==
Signs and symptoms depend on the targeted antigen, but the features in patients with different antibodies often overlap. The most characteristic feature found in a case series was cognitive impairment and seizures in anti-LGI-1 positive patients, and peripheral motor hyperexcitability in anti-CASPR2 positive patients.

anti-LGI-1 encephalitis: Patients with anti-LGI1 encephalitis have limbic encephalitis with amnesia and/or confusion (100%) and seizures (84-92 %) Other reported features include hyponatremia (in 60%), movement disorders (myoclonus/dyskinesia), sleep disorders (hypersomnia, insomnia, REM sleep behavior disorder, sleep reversal) and ataxia. Tonic seizures, with movements of the leg, arm or face, refractory to treatment with anti-epileptic drugs may precede the disorders, and should lead to testing for anti-LGI1 antibodies.

Anti-CASPR2 nervous system manifestations: Patients with anti-CASPIR2 antibodies develop symptoms from the CNS and/or the peripheral nervous system. The classic presentation is with Morvan’s syndrome, a disease with the features of neuromyotonia (i.e. peripheral hyperexcitability) and limbic encephalitis. Other patients present with isolated neuromyotonia or limbic encephalitis.Patients with anti-DPPX encephalitis present with symptoms of hyperexcitability such as agitation, tremor, muscle rigidity and gastrointestinal symptoms.

== Causes ==
The causes are in general unknown. However, a permeable intestine caused by microbiome dysbiosis has been implicated. The exposure to modern-day gluten proteins also causes the release of zonulin. Zonulin regulates intestinal lining tight junctions. HLA-DQ2 and HLA-DQ8 gene-carriers are also more prone. A paper published by Finn E. Somnier 15 April 2015 shows co-currence of autoantibodies. Some of the patients have tumours. The number of patients with anti-LGI1 antibodies and tumours have been reported to be between 0 and 11% in anti-LGI-1 antibody positive patients, and between 0-30 % in anti-CASPR2 antibody positive patients. Tumours have not been reported in patients with anti-DPPX antibodies. The associated tumour is often a thymoma.

== Pathophysiology ==
Patients with autoimmune encephalitis have antibodies towards synaptic proteins with neuronal functions. The antibodies are presumed to be disease causing, just like the acetylcholine receptor antibodies in myasthenia gravis.

The voltage-gated potassium channel (VGKC), like other ion channels, belong to a multiprotein complex. Some of the proteins which associates to the channel directly/indirectly include, but are not limited to, LGI1, CASPR2, Contactin2, DPPX, ADAM22 and ADAM23. LGI1 is a secreted neuronal protein which binds to ADAM22 and ADAM23 and thus crosslinks pre-synaptic VGKC with post-synaptic AMPA receptor. An inherited form of human epilepsy known as autosomal dominant partial epilepsy with auditory features (ADPEAF) has been found to be caused by mutations of the LGI1 gene. LGI1 knockout mice cause lethal epilepsy and the heterozygous mice have a lowered seizure threshold. Mutations of CNTNAP2 (the gene encoding CASPR2) have been reported to be associated with intellectual disability, motor impairment and epilepsy.

== Diagnosis ==
The diagnosis of autoimmune encephalitis is based on the exclusion of differential diagnosis. The first step is a clinical evaluation. Biochemical tests may reveal hyponatremia and the other features of SIADH. Relevant supplementary tests are listed in table 1. The diagnosis of VGKC-complex associated limbic encephalitis should be suspected in both men and women presenting with subacute debut of disorientation, confusion and amnesia especially when associated with seizures and signal change of the medial temporal lobe on MRI.

Investigation methods	Comments
MRI	Exclusion of differential diagnosis (e.g. cerebrovascular disease). Hyperintensity of affected regions on T2-images is characteristic. Sensitivity 60-84 %.
EEG	Exclusion of differential diagnosis. Non-characteristic findings may be found in autoimmune encephalitis.
Lumbar puncture	Exclusion of differential diagnosis (e.g. infectious diseases). Abnormalities may be found in autoimmune encephalitis.
Immunofluorescence/immunohistochemistry	On mammalian brain.
Rodent hippocampal culture	
Cell based assays	Using cell lines (e.g. HEK 293) transfected with recombinant proteins. Commercial products exists.
Radioimmunoassay	Non specific. Have the ability to detect antibodies towards undescribed VGKC-complex associated antigens. The complex probably contains unidentified antigens since about 20% of patients have antibodies which can’t be detected with the more specific assays.

== Treatment ==
The treatment is largely based on the treatment of anti-NMDAR encephalitis which is the most common autoimmune encephalitis. Treatment of an associated tumour is implicated in all paraneoplastic neurologic syndromes. Case series have been published where treatment has consisted of combinations of IVIG, plasmapheresis, glucocorticoids/other immunosuppressant drugs and rituximab.

== Prognosis ==
The prognosis with treatment is generally good and much better than in the classic paraneoplastic syndromes. In one of the two biggest case series, patients with anti-CASPR2 antibodies without tumours improved on average from a Modified Rankin Score (MRS) of 4 (moderate severe disability) to an MRS of 1 (no significant disability despite symptoms). However, patients with both anti-CASPR2 antibodies and tumours often deteriorated despite treatment. The improvements seen in patients with anti-LGI1 antibodies were slightly better.

== Epidemiology ==
The mean incidence of anti-LGI1 in Denmark is 1,1 per million compared to 3,3 per million for anti-NMDAR antibodies (NR1). The disorders may be underdiagnosed due to the lack of knowledge about the conditions and the limited availability of diagnostic tests. The group of patients with anti-LGI1 antibody associated limbic encephalitis have a male predominance and a mean age of about 60 years (variation 30–80 years). The other disorders with associated antibodies also seem to affect mostly older men.

== See also ==
- Anti-NMDAR encephalitis
- Limbic encephalitis
