= Morvan's syndrome =

- Specialty: Neurology
- Symptoms: Severe, barbiturate-refractory insomnia, agrypnia excitata, confusion, myoclonus, neuromyotonia, myokymia, autonomic failure, tachycardia, hyperhidrosis, constipation, arrhythmia, hallucinations, hyponatremia, cachexia
- Complications: Ventricular fibrillation, sudden cardiac arrest
- Usual onset: Variable, usually between 37 and 66 years of age
- Causes: Anti-CASPR2 or LGI1 antibodies, usually, but not always, secondary to cancer
- Risk factors: Male sex, cancer (usually a thymoma), Slavic heritage, various mutations
- Diagnostic method: Detection of anti-CASPR2 or LGI1 antibodies in cerebrospinal fluid, symptoms and screening for cancer assists diagnosis
- Differential diagnosis: Limbic encephalitis, Isaacs syndrome, Guillain-Barre syndrome, myasthenia gravis, fatal insomnia, other autoimmune diseases
- Prevention: Regularly screening for cancer
- Treatment: Plasma exchange, corticosteroids, treating the underlying cancer, if present
- Medication: Azathioprine, rituximab, lacosamide
- Prognosis: Variable, recovery rates range from seven in eight to two in three
- Frequency: Unknown, less than one in one million, probably underreported

Morvan's syndrome (also known as Morvan's fibrillary chorea or fibrillary chorea, abbreviated as MoS) is a rare, life-threatening autoimmune disease named after the nineteenth century French physician Augustin Marie Morvan. "La chorée fibrillaire" was coined by Morvan in 1890 when describing patients with multiple, irregular contractions of the long muscles, cramping, weakness, pruritus, hyperhidrosis, insomnia, and delirium. It normally presents with a slow insidious onset over months to years..

In 1890, Morvan described a patient with myokymia (muscle twitching) associated with muscle pain, excessive sweating, and disordered sleep. This rare disorder is characterized by severe insomnia, amounting to no less than complete lack of sleep (agrypnia) for weeks or months in a row, and associated with autonomic alterations consisting of profuse perspiration with characteristic skin miliaria (also known as sweat rash), tachycardia, increased body temperature, and hypertension. Patients display a remarkable hallucinatory behavior, and peculiar motor disturbances, which Morvan reported under the term “fibrillary chorea” but which are best described in modern terms as neuromyotonic discharges.

The association of the disease with thymoma, tumour, autoimmune diseases, and autoantibodies suggests an autoimmune or paraneoplastic aetiology. Besides an immune-mediated etiology, it is also believed to occur in gold, mercury, or manganese poisoning.

== Signs and symptoms ==
In one of the few reported cases, the subject presented with muscle weakness and fatigue, muscle twitching, excessive sweating and salivation, small joint pain, itching and weight loss. The subject also developed confusional episodes with spatial and temporal disorientation, visual and auditory hallucinations, complex behavior during sleep and progressive nocturnal insomnia associated with diurnal drowsiness. There was also severe constipation, urinary incontinence, and excessive lacrimation. When left alone, the subject would slowly lapse into a stuporous state with dreamlike episodes characterized by complex and quasi-purposeful gestures and movements (enacted dreams). Marked hyperhidrosis and excessive salivation were evident. Neurological examination disclosed diffuse muscle twitching and spontaneous and reflex myoclonus, slight muscle atrophy in the limbs, absence of tendon reflexes in the lower limbs and diffuse erythema especially on the trunk with scratching lesions of the skin. Compulsive behaviours, stereotypies and reduplicative paramnesias can be part of the CNS spectrum.

=== Insomnia ===
In all of the reported cases, the need for sleep was severely reduced and in some cases not necessary. The duration of sleep in one case decreased to about 2–4 hours per 24-hour period. Clinical features pertaining to insomnia include daytime drowsiness associated with a loss of ability to sleep, intermingled with confusional oneiric status, and the emergence of atypical REM sleep from wakefulness. The polysomnogram (PSG) picture of this disease is characterized by an inability to generate physiological sleep (key features are the suppression of the hallmarks of stage 2 non-REM sleep: spindles and K complexes) and by the emergence of REM sleep without atonia. The involvement of the thalamus and connected limbic structures in the pathology indicate the prominent role that the limbic thalamus plays in the pathophysiology of sleep. In a case documented in 1974, PSG findings documented the sustained absence of all sleep rhythms for up to a period of 4 months.

Electroencephalography (EEG) in one case was dominated by "wakefulness" and “subwakefulness” states alternating or intermingled with short (< 1 min) atypical REM sleep phases, characterized by a loss of muscle atonia. The “subwakefulness” state was characterized by 4–6 Hz theta activity intermingled with fast activity and desynchronized lower voltage theta activity, behaviourally associated with sleep-like somatic and autonomic behavior. The subject was said to have “agrypnia excitata”, which consists of severe total insomnia of long duration associated with decreased vigilance, mental confusion, hallucinations, motor agitation, and complex motor behavior mimicking dreams, and autonomic activation. CNS and autonomic symptoms were caused by impaired corticolimbic control of the subcortical structures regulating the sleep-wake and autonomic functions.

=== Neuromyotonia ===
Neuromyotonia refers to muscle twitching and cramping at rest that is exacerbated with exercise. It is caused by sustained or repetitive spontaneous muscle activity of peripheral nerve origin. Myokymia, or spontaneous rippling and twitching movements of muscles, is a visible component of neuromyotonia. Electromyography (EMG) discloses spontaneous, repetitive motor unit or single fiber discharges firing in irregular rhythmic bursts at high intraburst frequencies. Some of the muscles exhibiting twitching include the bilateral gastrocnemii, quadriceps femoris, biceps brachii, and right masseter. In vivo electrophysiological studies suggest at least some dysfunction of the muscle cell membrane. In the examined muscles, no abnormal insertional activity or fibrillation potentials were noted. Nerve conduction studies were normal.

=== Other symptoms ===
Breathing difficulties can occur, resulting from neuromyotonic activity of the laryngeal muscles. Laryngeal spasm possibly resulting from neuromyotonia has been described previously, and this highlights that, in patients with unexplained laryngospasm, neuromytonia should be added to the list of differential diagnoses.

Studies have shown subtly decreased metabolism on positron emission tomography (PET) and single photon emission computed tomography (SPECT) in the left inferior frontal and left temporal lobes. and or basal ganglia hypermetabolism. Ancillary laboratory tests including MRI and brain biopsy have confirmed temporal lobe involvement. Cranial MRI shows increased signal in the hippocampus.

Cerebral spinal fluid (CSF) shows normal protein, glucose, white blood cell, and immunoglobulin G (IgG) levels, but there are weak oligoclonal bands, which are absent in the blood serum. Marked changes in circadian serum levels of neurohormones and increased levels of peripheral neurotransmitters were also observed. The absence of morphological alterations of the brain pathology, the suggestion of diffusion of IgG into the thalamus and striatum, more marked than in the cortex (consistent with effects on the thalamolimbic system) the oligoclonal bands in the CSF and the amelioration after PE all strongly support an antibody-mediated basis for the condition. Raised CSF IgG concentrations and oligoclonal bands have been reported in patients with psychosis. Anti-acetylcholine receptors (anti-AChR) antibodies have also been detected in patients with thymoma, but without clinical manifestations of myasthenia gravis. There have also been reports of non-paraneoplastic limbic encephalitis associated with raised serum VGKC suggesting that these antibodies may give rise to a spectrum of neurological disease presenting with symptoms arising peripherally, centrally, or both. Yet, in two cases, oligoclonal bands were absent in the CSF and serum, and CSF immunoglobulin profiles were unremarkable.

=== Comorbid conditions ===
In one case, a patient was diagnosed with both Morvan's syndrome and pulmonary hyalinizing granulomas (PHG). PHG are rare fibrosing lesions of the lung, which have central whorled deposits of lamellar collagen. How these two diseases relate to one another is still unclear.

Thymoma, prostate adenoma, and in situ carcinoma of the sigmoid colon have also been found in patients with Morvan's Syndrome.

== Mechanism ==
Antibodies against voltage-gated potassium channels (VGKC), which are detectable in about 40% of patients with acquired neuromytonia, have been implicated in Morvan's pathophysiology. Raised serum levels of antibodies to VGKCs have been reported in three patients with Morvan's Syndrome. Binding of serum from a patient with Morvan's Syndrome to the hippocampus in a similar pattern of antibodies to known VGKC suggest that these antibodies can also cause CNS dysfunction. Additional antibodies against neuromuscular junction channels and receptors have also been described. Experimental evidence exists that these anti-VGKC antibodies cause nerve hyperexcitability by suppression of voltage gated K+ outward currents, whereas other, yet undefined humoral factors have been implicated in anti-VGKC antibody negative neuromyotonia. It is believed that antibodies to the Shaker-type K+ channels (the Kv1 family) are the type of potassium channel most strongly associated with acquired neuromyotonia and Morvan's Syndrome.

Whether VGKC antibodies play a pathogenic role in the encephalopathy as they do in the peripheral nervous system is as yet unclear. It has been suggested that the VGKC antibodies may cross the blood–brain barrier and act centrally, binding predominantly to thalamic and striatal neurons causing encephalopathic and autonomic features.

== Differential diagnosis ==
The symptoms of Morvan's Syndrome have been noted to bear a striking similarity to limbic encephalitis (LE). These include the CNS symptoms consisting of insomnia, hallucinations, and disorientation, as well as dementia and psychosis. Both entities can be paraneoplastic and associated with thymoma. Recently, VGKC antibodies were found in patients with LE, strengthening the hypothesis that LE and Morvan's Syndrome may be closely connected. Varying symptoms may be used to determine which of the two diseases the subject has. Amnesia, seizures, and mesial temporal lobe structural abnormalities are features of LE, whereas myokymia, hyperhidrosis, and insomnia favor Morvan's Syndrome.

== Treatment ==
In most of the reported cases, the treatment options were very similar. Plasmapheresis alone or in combination with steroids, sometimes also with thymectomy and azathioprine, have been the most frequently used therapeutic approach in treating Morvan's Syndrome. However, this does not always work, as failed response to steroids and to subsequently added plasmapheresis have been reported. Intravenous immunoglobulin was effective in one case.

In one case, the dramatic response to high-dose oral prednisolone together with pulse methylprednisolone with almost complete disappearance of the symptoms within a short period should induce consideration of corticosteroids.

In another case, the subject was treated with haloperidol (6 mg/day) with some improvement in the psychomotor agitation and hallucinations, but even high doses of carbamazepine given to the subject failed to improve the spontaneous muscle activity. Plasma Exchange (PE) was initiated, and after the third such session, the itching, sweating, mental disturbances, and complex nocturnal behavior improved and these symptoms completely disappeared after the sixth session, with improvement in insomnia and reduced muscle twitching. However, one month after the sixth PE session, there was a progressive worsening of insomnia and diurnal drowsiness, which promptly disappeared after another two PE sessions.

In one case, high dose steroid treatment resulted in a transient improvement, but aggressive immuno-suppressive therapy with cyclophosphamide was necessary to control the disease and result in a dramatic clinical improvement.

In another case, the subject was treated with prednisolone (1 mg/kg body weight) with carbamazepine, propranolol, and amitriptyline. After two weeks, improvement with decreased stiffness and spontaneous muscle activity and improved sleep was observed. After another 7–10 days, the abnormal sleep behavior disappeared completely.

In another case, symptomatic improvement with plasmapheresis, thymectomy, and chronic immunosuppression provide further support for an autoimmune or paraneoplastic basis.

Although thymectomy is believed to be a key element in the proposed treatment, there is a reported case of Morvan's Syndrome presenting itself post-thymectomy.

== Epidemiology ==
There are only about 14 reported cases of Morvan's syndrome in the English literature. With only a limited number of reported cases, the complete spectrum of the central nervous system (CNS) symptomatology has not been well established. The natural history of Morvan's is highly variable. Two cases have been reported to remit spontaneously. Others have required a combination of plasmapheresis and long term immunosuppression, although in one of these cases the patient died shortly after receiving plasma exchange (PE). Other fatalities without remission have been described by, amongst others, Morvan himself.
