= Side effect =

Outcome that is secondary to the one intended

In medicine, a side effect is an unintended effect caused by a medicinal drug or other treatment's capacities or properties, and these effects are often adverse but sometimes beneficial. Herbal and traditional medicines also have side effects.

A drug or procedure usually used for a specific effect may be used specifically because of a beneficial side-effect; this is termed "off-label use" until such use is approved. For instance, X-rays have long been used as an imaging technique; the discovery of their oncolytic capability led to their use in radiotherapy for ablation of malignant tumours.

== Frequency of side effects ==
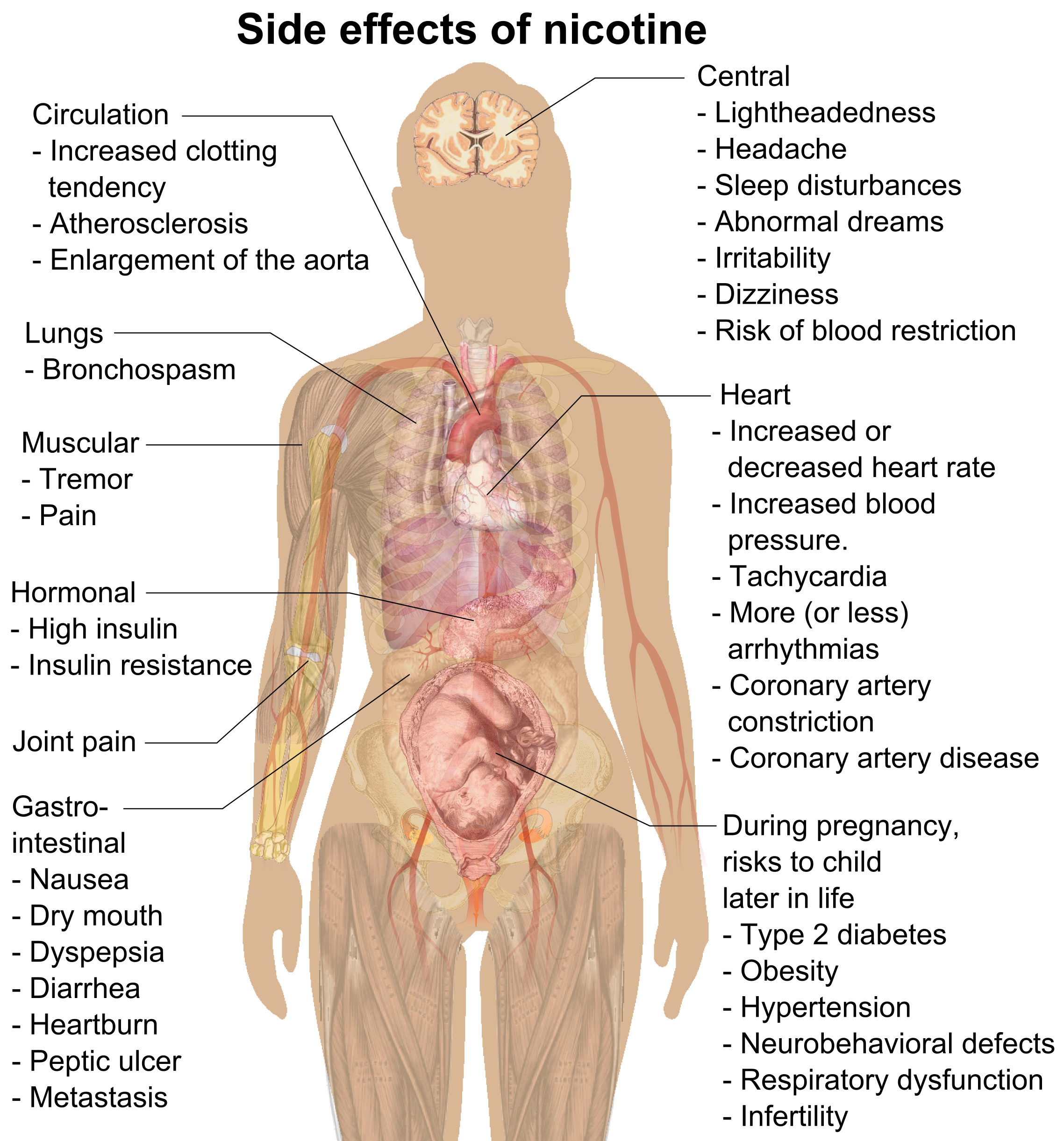
Possible side effects of nicotine

The World Health Organization and other health organisations characterise the probability of experiencing side effects as:

- Very common, ≥ ^{1}/_{10}
- Common (frequent), ^{1}/_{10} to ^{1}/_{100}
- Uncommon (infrequent), ^{1}/_{100} to ^{1}/_{1000}
- Rare, ^{1}/_{1000} to ^{1}/_{10000}
- Very rare, < ^{1}/_{10000}

The European Commission recommends that the list should contain only effects where there is "at least a reasonable possibility" that they are caused by the drug and the frequency "should represent crude incidence rates (and not differences or relative risks calculated against placebo or other comparator)". The frequency describes how often symptoms appear after taking the drug, without assuming that they were necessarily caused by the drug. Both healthcare providers and lay people misinterpret the frequency of side effects as describing the increase in frequency caused by the drug.

== Examples of therapeutic side effects ==
Most drugs and procedures have a multitude of reported adverse side effects; the information leaflets provided with virtually all drugs list possible side effects. Beneficial side effects are less common; some examples, in many cases of side-effects that ultimately gained regulatory approval as intended effects, are:

- Bevacizumab (Avastin), used to slow the growth of blood vessels, has been used against dry age-related macular degeneration, as well as macular edema from diseases such as diabetic retinopathy and central retinal vein occlusion.
- Buprenorphine has been shown experimentally (1982–1995) to be effective against severe, refractory depression.
- Bupropion (Wellbutrin), an anti-depressant, also helps smoking cessation; this indication was later approved, and the name of the drug as sold for smoking cessation is Zyban. Bupropion branded as Zyban may be sold at a higher price than as Wellbutrin, so some physicians prescribe Wellbutrin for smoking cessation.
- Carbamazepine is an approved treatment for bipolar disorder and epileptic seizures, but it has side effects useful in treating attention-deficit hyperactivity disorder (ADHD), schizophrenia, phantom limb syndrome, paroxysmal extreme pain disorder, neuromyotonia, and post-traumatic stress disorder.
- Dexamethasone and betamethasone in premature labor, to enhance pulmonary maturation of the fetus.
- Doxepin has been used to treat angioedema and severe allergic reactions due to its strong antihistamine properties.
- Gabapentin, approved for treatment of seizures and postherpetic neuralgia in adults, has side effects which are useful in treating bipolar disorder, essential tremor, hot flashes, migraine prophylaxis, neuropathic pain syndromes, phantom limb syndrome, and restless leg syndrome.
- Hydroxyzine, an antihistamine, is also used as an anxiolytic.
- Magnesium sulfate in obstetrics for premature labor and preeclampsia.
- Methotrexate (MTX), approved for the treatment of choriocarcinoma, is frequently used for the medical treatment of an unruptured ectopic pregnancy.
- The SSRI medication sertraline is approved as an antidepressant but delays sexual climax in men, and can be used to treat premature ejaculation.
- Sildenafil was originally intended for pulmonary hypertension; subsequently, it was discovered that it also produces erections, for which it was later approved.
- Terazosin, an α_{1}-adrenergic antagonist approved to treat benign prostatic hyperplasia (enlarged prostate) and hypertension, is (one of several drugs) used off-label to treat drug induced diaphoresis and hyperhidrosis (excessive sweating).
- Thalidomide, a drug sold over the counter from 1957 to 1961 as a tranquiliser and treatment for morning sickness of pregnancy, became notorious for causing tens of thousands of babies to be born without limbs and with other conditions, or stillborn. The drug, though still subject to other adverse side-effects, is now used to treat cancers and skin disorders, and is on the World Health Organization's List of Essential Medicines.

== See also ==
- Adverse drug reaction (ADR), a harmful unintended result caused by taking medication
- Combined drug intoxication
- Conservative management
- Drug-drug interaction (DDI), an alteration of the action of a drug caused by the administration of other drugs
- Iatrogenesis
- Paradoxical reaction, an effect of a substance opposite to what would usually be expected
- Pharmacogenetics, the use of genetic information to determine which type of drugs will work best for a patient
- Unintended consequences
