= Twitch =

Twitch may refer to:

== Biology ==
- Muscle contraction, otherwise known as twitching
  - Convulsion, rapid and repeated muscle contraction and relaxation
  - Fasciculation, a small, local, involuntary muscle contraction
  - Myoclonic twitch, a jerk usually caused by sudden muscle contractions
  - Myokymia, a continuous, involuntary muscle twitch that affects the muscles of the face
  - Spasm, a sudden, involuntary contraction
  - Tic, an involuntary, repetitive, nonrhythmic action
  - Tremor, an involuntary, repetitive, somewhat rhythmic action
- Twitching motility, a form of crawling some bacteria use to move over surfaces

== Entertainment ==
- Twitch (service), an American live streaming video website
- Twitch (film), a 2005 short directed by Leah Meyerhoff
- Screen Anarchy, formerly Twitch Film or Twitch, a film news and review website
- Maximilian "Twitch" Williams, a character in the comic series Sam and Twitch
- "Twitch", a fictional character from the book How to Eat Fried Worms and its 2006 film adaptation
- Twitch gameplay, a computer or video game that challenges the player's reaction time

=== Music ===
- Twitch (Ministry album), 1986
- Twitch (Aldo Nova album), 1985, or the title track
- Twitch (EP), by Jebediah, 1996
- "Twitch", a 2000 song by Bif Naked from Another 5 Songs and a Poem
- "Twitch", a 2001 song by Christina Milian from her self-titled album

== People ==
- Stephen "tWitch" Boss (1982–2022), American freestyle hip-hop dancer, entertainer and actor
- Jeremy Stenberg (born 1981), American motocross rider

== Other uses ==
- Twitch (device), used to restrain horses
- Twitch grass
- Twitch, in birdwatching, to pursue and observe a rare bird

== See also ==
- Twitches (disambiguation)
- Nintendo Switch
