= Anti-Hu associated encephalitis =

- Other names: Anti-ANNA1 associated encephalitis
- Specialty: Psychiatry, neurology
- Symptoms: Depression, anxiety, hallucinations, confusion, memory loss, weakness, numbness, ataxia, seizures, pain
- Causes: Paraneoplastic syndrome
- Risk factors: Smoking, male gender
- Diagnostic method: Western blot, EEG, MRI
- Differential diagnosis: Autoimmune encephalitis, metastatic cancer, viral encephalitis, Creutzfeldt-Jakob disease, cerebrovascular disease, Whipple disease, schizophrenia, toxic-metabolic encephalopathy, Wernicke encephalopathy, dementia, multiple sclerosis, Behçet's disease
- Treatment: Immunotherapy, chemotherapy
- Prognosis: Average survival less than 12 months

Anti-Hu associated encephalitis, also known as Anti-ANNA1 associated encephalitis, is an uncommon form of brain inflammation that is associated with an underlying cancer. It can cause psychiatric symptoms such as depression, anxiety, and hallucinations. It can also produce neurological symptoms such as confusion, memory loss, weakness, sensory loss, pain, seizures, and problems coordinating the movement of the body.

While its cause is unknown, the most common hypothesis is that it is caused by an immune system attack on the nervous system. This immune system attack is linked to cancer in most cases, usually small cell lung carcinoma. The condition's namesake, the anti-Hu antibody, is a protein made by the host's immune system, and it is present in virtually all cases. Treatment is focused on removing the underlying cancer and suppressing the immune system. Its prognosis remains quite poor, with most patients dying less than a year after diagnosis.

== Signs and symptoms ==
The signs and symptoms can vary in onset, quality, duration, severity, and response to treatment. Symptoms tend to present acutely over days to weeks. Its symptoms depend on which areas of the brain the disease affects, because specific parts of the brain have particular functions.

Many cases involve an attack on the limbic system, which includes structures like the amygdala, hippocampus, and thalamus. Respectively these brain regions regulate anger, fear, memory formation, and motor and sensory signaling. Affected persons may develop memory loss and may have sudden changes in personality. This is often accompanied by headaches, delusions, or hallucinations.

In some cases, the antibodies created by this illness attack another structure of the brain called the brainstem. The brainstem is responsible for basic bodily functions like breathing, but not more complex actions and emotions, which is why the presentation is different when the disease affects the limbic system than when it affects the brainstem. Symptoms may include dizziness, nausea, vomiting, and decreased breathing which may progress to respiratory failure.

== Cause ==
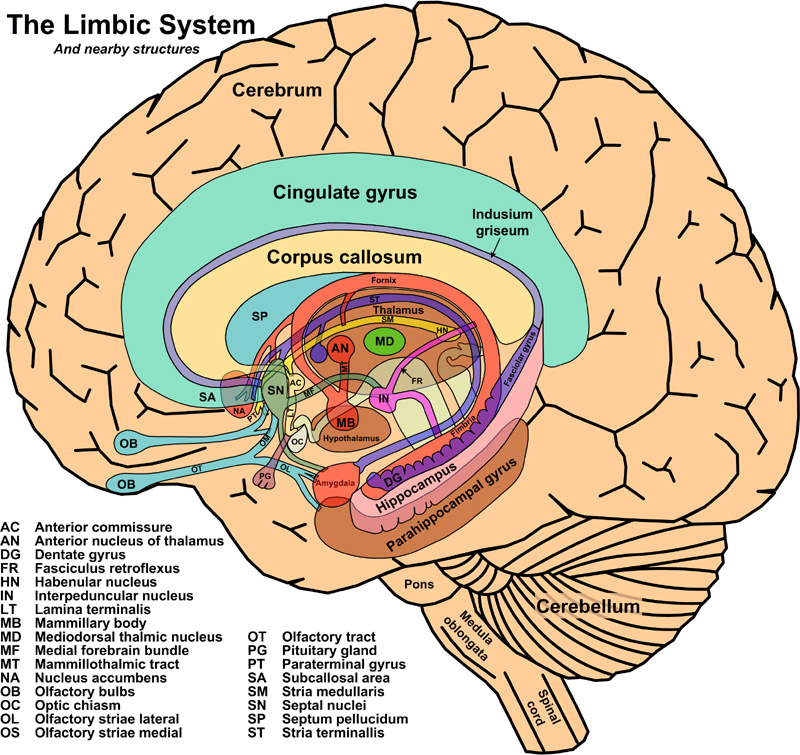
The condition can involve the limbic system of the brain, which mediates key functions within motivation, emotion, learning, and memory.

Anti-Hu associated encephalitis is a syndrome associated with cancer. However, occasionally it occurs without cancer being present. Proteins react within the brain and change behavior and basic biological functions. Primarily adults contract this illness, and typically they have an underlying cancer that is either undiagnosed, diagnosed, in remission, or cured.

The condition can occur at any point during cancer. Small cell lung cancer is a particularly aggressive cancer more common in smokers and is associated with anti-Hu encephalitis. Neuroblastoma is a cancer more frequently affecting children, and despite the relatively low rates of anti-Hu among children with neuroblastoma, these are the most likely children to have anti-Hu associated encephalitis.

== Pathophysiology ==
Nearly all people with paraneoplastic sensory neuronopathy and encephalomyelitis associated with small-cell lung cancer have anti-Hu antibodies in their serum, and the condition has been found to occur with other tumor types expressing Hu antigen. The antibody is produced by the body as an immune system response to Hu proteins, which are naturally clustered within the nuclei of neurons in the central and peripheral nervous system where they function as RNA-binding proteins promoting stability of messenger RNA. The condition can involve a number of neural structures including the brainstem, cerebellum, spinal cord, dorsal roots, peripheral nerves, and the limbic system of the brain.

There is a debate about whether the antibody is a cause of, rather than an effect of, the disease process. Older studies suggested the antibodies caused the disease, pointing to the discovery of antibody deposition in the brain tissue of patients at autopsy. However, the injection of the antibodies into mice did not produce any disease, and the deposition of antibody was often not at the places where brain damage was greatest. Newer studies suggest the antibodies are an effect, not a cause, of the condition, with a consensus that a patient's own T cells are playing a major role in the disease process. These T cells may be activated by the Hu proteins.

In people with cancer, the cancer has a likely role in the cause of the encephalitis. In a paraneoplastic syndrome, a cancer cell can create proteins that are normally only found as naturally occurring proteins in other cell types in other parts of the body. In patients with small cell carcinoma of the lung, cancer cells in the lung can produce Hu proteins that are usually only found inside of the body's own neurons. It is hypothesized that through these cancer-produced Hu proteins, the body creates an immune system response. This reaction includes T cells, which then attack nervous tissue. The cancer-produced Hu proteins are found in nearly all small-cell lung carcinomas, 70 percent of neuroblastomas, and a small percentage of other tumors.

== Diagnosis ==
Anti-Hu encephalitis is a disease characterized by production of anti-Hu antibodies and rapid development of particular signs and symptoms. Therefore, the diagnosis usually involves detecting its associated psychiatric and neurologic deficits and then performing diagnostic testing. If these signs and symptoms occur in a person who is suspected of having cancer, then anti-Hu associated encephalitis is also suspected. Because small cell lung cancer commonly occurs together with anti-Hu encephalitis, a diagnosis of small cell lung cancer confers a greater suspicion.

In suspected cases, physicians perform diagnostic testing using a protein-detecting test that identify anti-Hu antibodies, if present. Another test involves examining the fluid that bathes the brain and spine, although this test is less specific for the disease. Physicians may also use a special imaging device, known as magnetic resonance imaging (MRI), which can take pictures of the patient's brain and detect signs of inflammation that suggest ongoing disease. An electroencephalogram (EEG) is another tool that can be done to clarify whether anti-Hu encephalitis is the underlying cause of a patient's symptoms. This is a test that involves placing probes on a person's head to detect electrical brain activity. Certain patterns of activity can be indicative of brain disease. In the case of anti-Hu encephalitis, temporal lobe electrical activity changes and the length of certain electrical waves known as delta and theta waves become slowed.

Before the diagnosis can be made, other causes of disease need to be ruled out. They could be the sole cause or a co-contributor to a patient's new symptoms, in addition to anti-Hu encephalitis. Examples include—but are not limited to—problems with metabolism, a brain tumor, or inflammation of tissue coating around the brain.

== Treatment ==
The mainstay of treatment involves two broad strategies: treat the cancer that usually occurs with the disease, and give medications that suppress the body's immune system attack on the nervous system. Because current treatments are not successful at eliminating the disease, the goal of treatment is often to reduce symptoms rather than attempt to cure it. To date, treatments have been unsuccessful in achieving a sustained reduction of symptoms or survival in the vast majority of patients.

Some treatments may directly combat the mechanisms by which the disease may be caused. To suppress the immune system, steroids, antibodies, or even human cells may be injected into a patient. Certain types of antibodies called intravenous immunoglobulins (IVIG) also have shown to lead to reduced symptoms due to their ability to reduce and eliminate anti-Hu antibodies. A drug called rituximab, a molecule that targets B cells, helps reduce the symptoms of anti-Hu encephalitis and decreases the number of anti-Hu antibodies. Cancer treatment may involve surgical removal of the tumor, or medications that may shrink or eliminate the tumor. Treatment with cyclophosphamide, a chemotherapy drug, has shown promise, in addition to adrenocorticotropic hormone (ACTH). This hormone is involved in regulating many body functions including stress level and blood pressure. Steroids such as dexamethasone may help reduce disease burden by reducing the antibody-building activity of the disease. Despite the fact that steroids can be used to reduce the immunological antibody-building activity of the disease in all people, many other anti-Hu encephalitis treatments are most effective in children.

Treatments may also be focused purely on symptoms rather than targeting the potential causes of the disease. For seizures, anticonvulsant medications may be used, such as valproic acid, levetiracetam, or lamotrigine. For hallucinations, delusions, and mood disturbances, second generation antipsychotic agents (e.g., olanzapine, clozapine) are also used for symptom control.

== Prognosis ==
Although many patients have an underlying cancer, the prognosis is determined by the severity of the neurological symptoms produced by the encephalitis. Compared to other paraneoplastic encephalitides, anti-Hu associated encephalitis has an especially poor prognosis. Several studies reporting an average survival time of less than a year, from the time of diagnosis. Much of the prognosis depends on the efficacy of treatment, which is directed at the underlying cancer, if present. Patients with lower titers of the anti-Hu antibody tend to have a better prognosis.

== Epidemiology ==
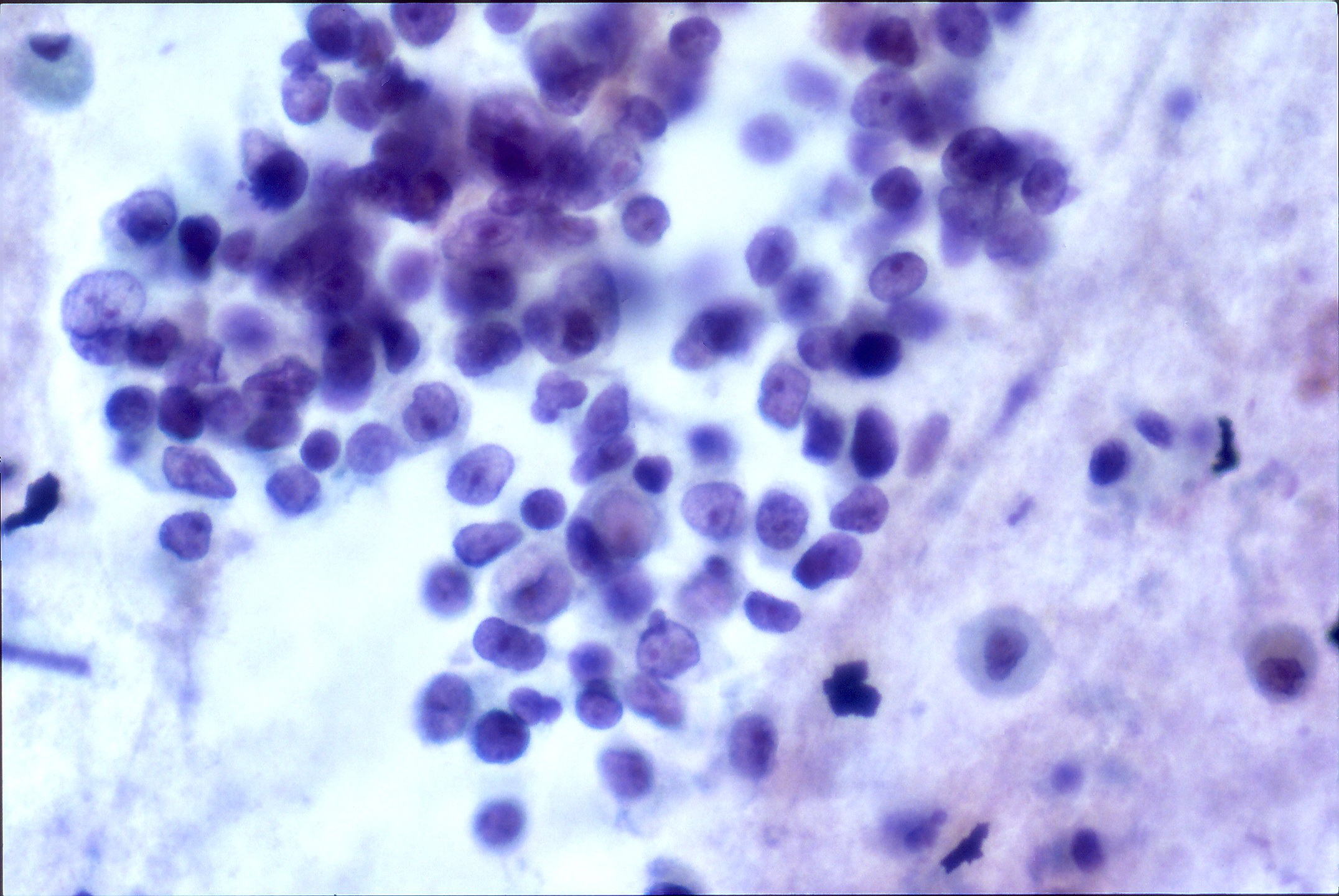
Histopathology of small cell carcinoma of the lung, which is strongly associated with anti-Hu antibodies.

The typical age at diagnosis is 63 years old. It is three times more common in men than women. Of those diagnosed with the condition, about 85 percent also had a cancer diagnosis, with 86 percent being lung cancers (mostly small-cell carcinoma) and 14 percent being outside the lung (most commonly prostate, gastrointestinal, breast, and bladder cancer). However, other cancers have been known to co-occur with the disease, including spindle cell carcinoma of the sinus and a seminoma of the mediastinum. People with small cell carcinoma often have other diseases caused by an immune response to the cancer, including Cushing syndrome, SIADH, and Lambert-Eaton myasthenic syndrome.

== History ==
The condition was first identified in 1985 at the Memorial Sloan Kettering Cancer Center at Cornell University, by three physicians, Francesc Graus, Carlos Cordon-Cardo, and Jerome Posner. They identified the anti-Hu antibody in two patients who had sensory neuronopathy and small cell carcinoma of the lung.

== Special populations ==
Children, in addition to adults, also can develop anti-Hu encephalitis; however, the disease manifests differently in children. As with adults, anti-Hu encephalitis is associated with malignancy. The cancers most associated with anti-Hu encephalitis are neuroblastoma and ganglioneuroblastoma. Opsoclonus-myoclonus syndrome (OMS) is a condition that develops in children as a result of anti-Hu antibodies. The illness afflicts younger children, with one study showing an age range of about 2 months to 10 years, with the majority of cases falling between 6 months to 3 years. The first symptoms are nonspecific. For instance, it can present like an upper airway infection, with cough and fever, or like an intestinal infection, with vomiting, diarrhea, and fever. Crying, particularly in younger children, can be an early sign. Other symptoms include problems with eye movement, irritability, and insomnia.

== See also ==
- Anti-NMDA receptor encephalitis
- Limbic encephalitis
- Paraneoplastic syndrome
