= Neuromyotonia =

- Other names: Isaacs syndrome, Isaacs-Mertens syndrome
- Specialty: Neurology, neuromuscular medicine

Neuromyotonia (NMT) is a form of peripheral nerve hyperexcitability that causes spontaneous muscular activity resulting from repetitive motor unit action potentials of peripheral origin. NMT along with Morvan's syndrome are the most severe types in the Peripheral Nerve Hyperexciteability spectrum. Example of two more common and less severe syndromes in the spectrum are cramp fasciculation syndrome and benign fasciculation syndrome. NMT can have both hereditary and acquired (non-inherited) forms. The prevalence of NMT is unknown.

== Signs and symptoms ==
NMT is a diverse disorder. As a result of muscular hyperactivity, patients may present with muscle cramps, stiffness, myotonia-like symptoms (slow relaxation), associated walking difficulties, hyperhidrosis (excessive sweating), myokymia (quivering of a muscle), fasciculations (muscle twitching), fatigue, exercise intolerance, myoclonic jerks and other related symptoms. These neuromyotonic discharges can cause bursts of spontaneous motor activity that present either continuously or in recurring, decrementing clusters. They can start and stop abruptly, typically waning in strength and are unaffected by voluntary activity.

The symptoms (especially the stiffness and fasciculations) are most prominent in the calves, legs, trunk, and sometimes the face and neck, but can also affect other body parts. NMT symptoms may fluctuate in severity and frequency. Symptoms range from mere inconvenience to debilitating. At least a third of people also experience sensory symptoms.

== Causes ==
The three causes of NMT are:

1. Acquired
2. Paraneoplastic
3. Hereditary

The acquired form is the most common, accounting for up to 80 percent of all cases and is suspected to be autoimmune-mediated, which is usually caused by antibodies against the neuromuscular junction.

The exact cause is unknown. However, autoreactive antibodies can be detected in a variety of peripheral (e.g. myasthenia gravis, Lambert–Eaton myasthenic syndrome) and central nervous system (e.g. paraneoplastic cerebellar degeneration, paraneoplastic limbic encephalitis) disorders. Their causative role has been established in some of these diseases but not all. Neuromyotonia is considered to be one of these with accumulating evidence for autoimmune origin over the last few years. Autoimmune neuromyotonia is typically caused by antibodies that bind to potassium channels on the motor nerve resulting in continuous/hyper-excitability. Onset is typically seen between the ages of 15–60, with most experiencing symptoms before the age of 40. Some neuromyotonia cases do not only improve after plasma exchange but they may also have antibodies in their serum samples against voltage-gated potassium channels. Moreover, these antibodies have been demonstrated to reduce potassium channel function in neuronal cell lines.

It is suspected that the peripheral nerve hyperexcitability associated with Isaacs' and Morvan's syndromes is a result of a potassium channel defect in the motor nerve membrane.

== Diagnosis ==
Diagnosis is clinical and initially consists of ruling out more common conditions, disorders, and diseases, and usually begins at the general practitioner level. A doctor may conduct a basic neurological exam, including coordination, strength, reflexes, sensation, etc. A doctor may also run a series of tests that include blood work and MRIs.

From there, a patient is likely to be referred to a neurologist or a neuromuscular specialist. The neurologist or specialist may run a series of more specialized tests, including needle electromyography EMG/ and nerve conduction studies (NCS) (these are the most important tests), chest CT (to rule out paraneoplastic) and specific blood work looking for voltage-gated potassium channel antibodies, acetylcholine receptor antibody, and serum immunofixation, TSH, ANA ESR, EEG etc. Neuromyotonia is characterized electromyographically by doublet, triplet or multiplet single unit discharges that have a high, irregular intraburst frequency. Fibrillation potentials and fasciculations are often also present with electromyography.

Because the condition is so rare, it can often be years before a correct diagnosis is made.

NMT is not fatal and many of the symptoms can be controlled. However, because NMT mimics some symptoms of motor neuron disease (ALS) and other more severe diseases, which may be fatal, there can often be significant anxiety until a diagnosis is made. In some rare cases, acquired neuromyotonia has been misdiagnosed as amyotrophic lateral sclerosis (ALS) particularly if fasciculations may be evident in the absence of other clinical features of ALS. However, fasciculations are rarely the first sign of ALS as the hallmark sign is weakness. Similarly, multiple sclerosis has been the initial misdiagnosis in some NMT patients. In order to get an accurate diagnosis see a trained neuromuscular specialist.

People diagnosed with benign fasciculation syndrome or enhanced physiological tremor may experience similar symptoms as NMT, although it is unclear today whether BFS or EPT are weak forms of NMT.

=== Types ===
There are three main types of NMT:

- Chronic
- Monophasic (symptoms that resolve within several years of onset; postinfection, postallergic)
- Relapsing Remitting

=== Peripheral nerve hyperexcitability ===
Neuromyotonia is a type of peripheral nerve hyperexcitability. Peripheral nerve hyperexcitability is an umbrella diagnosis that includes (in order of severity of symptoms from least severe to most severe) benign fasciculation syndrome, cramp fasciculation syndrome, neuromyotonia and morvan's syndrome. Some doctors will only give the diagnosis of peripheral nerve hyperexcitability as the differences between the three are largely a matter of the severity of the symptoms and can be subjective. However, some objective EMG criteria have been established to help distinguish between the three.

Moreover, the generic use of the term peripheral nerve hyperexcitability syndromes to describe the aforementioned conditions is recommended and endorsed by several prominent researchers and practitioners in the field.

== Treatments ==
There is no known cure for neuromyotonia, but the condition is treatable. Anticonvulsants, including phenytoin and carbamazepine, usually provide significant relief from the stiffness, muscle spasms, and pain associated with neuromyotonia. Plasma exchange and IVIg treatment may provide short-term relief for patients with some forms of the acquired disorder. It is speculated that the plasma exchange causes an interference with the function of the voltage-dependent potassium channels, one of the underlying issues of hyper-excitability in autoimmune neuromyotonia. Botox injections also provide short-term relief. Immunosuppressants such as Prednisone may provide long term relief for patients with some forms of the acquired disorder.

== Prognosis ==
The long-term prognosis is uncertain, and has mostly to do with the underlying cause; i.e. autoimmune, paraneoplastic, etc. However, in recent years increased understanding of the basic mechanisms of NMT and autoimmunity has led to the development of novel treatment strategies. NMT disorders are now amenable to treatment and their prognoses are good. Many patients respond well to treatment, which usually provide significant relief of symptoms. Some cases of spontaneous remission have been noted, including Isaac's original two patients when followed up 14 years later.

While NMT symptoms may fluctuate, they generally don't deteriorate into anything more serious, and with the correct treatment the symptoms are manageable.

A very small proportion of cases with NMT may develop central nervous system findings in their clinical course, causing a disorder called Morvan's syndrome, and they may also have antibodies against potassium channels in their serum samples. Sleep disorder is only one of a variety of clinical conditions observed in Morvan's syndrome cases ranging from confusion and memory loss to hallucinations and delusions. However, this is a separate disorder.

Some studies have linked NMT with certain types of cancers, mostly lung and thymus, suggesting that NMT may be paraneoplastic in some cases. In these cases, the underlying cancer will determine prognosis. However, most examples of NMT are autoimmune and not associated with cancer.
