= Cramp fasciculation syndrome =

Peripheral nerve disorder

Cramp fasciculation syndrome (CFS) is a rare peripheral nerve hyperexcitability disorder. It is more severe than the related (and common) disorder known as benign fasciculation syndrome; it causes fasciculations, cramps, pain, fatigue, and muscle stiffness similar to those seen in neuromyotonia (another related condition). Patients with CFS, like those with neuromyotonia, may also experience paresthesias. Most cases of cramp fasciculation syndrome are idiopathic, although some research points to an autoimmune component that may be partly genetic in etiology. Cramp fasciculation syndrome is diagnosed by clinical examination and electromyography (EMG). Fasciculation is the only abnormality (if any) seen with EMG. Cramp fasciculation syndrome is a chronic condition. Treatment options include anti-seizure medications such as carbamazepine, immunosuppressive drugs and plasmapheresis.

== Signs and symptoms ==
Symptoms are very similar to those found in benign fasciculation syndrome and include:

- muscle cramping (primary symptom)
- muscle pain
- muscle stiffness
- generalized fatigue
- anxiety
- exercise intolerance
- globus sensations
- paraesthesias.
- hyperreflexia

== Diagnosis ==
The procedure of diagnosis for Cramp Fasciculation Syndrome (CFS) is closely aligned with the diagnosis procedure for benign fasciculation syndrome (BFS). The differentiation between a diagnosis of BFS versus CFS is usually more severe and prominent pain, cramps and stiffness associated with CFS.

== Treatment ==
Treatment is similar to treatment for benign fasciculation syndrome.

Carbamazepine therapy has been found to provide moderate reductions in symptoms.
