= Twitches =

Twitches may refer to:

- Twitches (novel series), a 2000s American children's fantasy novel series by H. B. Gilmour and Randi Reisfeld
- Twitches (film), the 2005 Disney Channel Original Movie based on the children's fantasy novel series above
- Twitches Too, the 2007 sequel to the Disney Channel Original Movie above
- Fasciculations, muscle twitches
