= Autosomal dominant partial epilepsy with auditory features =

Autosomal dominant partial epilepsy with auditory features syndrome
- Specialty: Medical genetics
- Symptoms: epilepsy, hearing and vision hallucinations, and aphasia
- Causes: Genetic mutation
- Frequency: rare

Autosomal dominant partial epilepsy with auditory features syndrome is a rare, relatively benign, hereditary epileptic disorder that is characterized by seizures, seizure-associated hearing alterations and receptive aphasia.

== Signs & symptoms ==
Symptoms of this disorder usually begin appearing in adolescence-early adulthood. People with this disorder have may auditory symptoms before and during seizures. For example:

- Buzzing
- Ringing
- Humming
- Voices
- Music
- Changes in the intensity/volume of sound
- Changes in the senses
- Inability to understand speech (receptive aphasia)

Less commonly, visual hallucinations, smell abnormalities, and/or vertigo can occur before and during seizures. Some people may experience receptive aphasia before temporarily losing consciousness to a seizure.

Some people with this disorder report that there are specific sounds which can trigger their seizures. But most people do not have a known trigger. People with ADPEAF may have different kinds of seizures, but partial seizures are often the most common. The frequency of seizures can vary greatly from person-to-person.

== Causes ==
Variants in the LGI1 gene or the RELN gene have commonly been hypothesized to be a cause of ADPEAF. However, recent advances have supported the idea that whether someone has ADPEAF is usually not determined by genetics alone. Rather, there are probably multiple factors causing someone to have it. It is not uncommon for people with ADPEAF to have no known family members with the disorder.

== History ==
This condition was first reported in 1995, when Ottman et al. described a family with recurrent seizures and auditory symptoms.
