= Autoimmune encephalitis =

Type of encephalitis

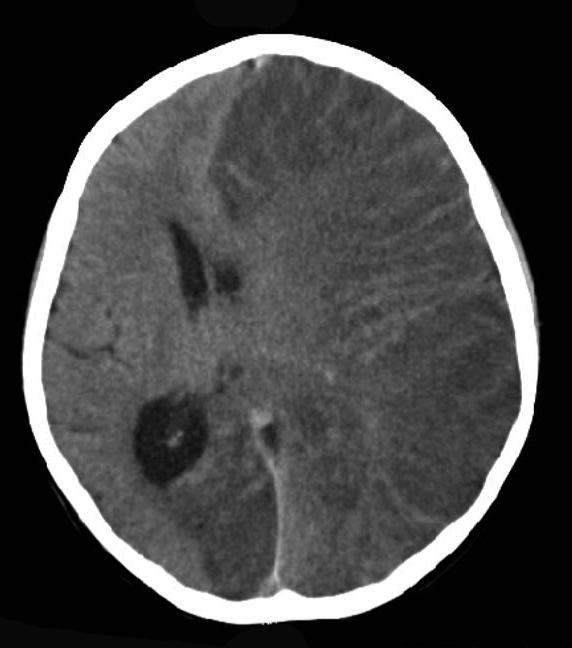
- Brain CT scan without contrast enhancement of a patient, female, 8 years old, with Rasmussen's encephalitis.

Autoimmune encephalitis (AIE) is a type of encephalitis, and one of the most common causes of noninfectious encephalitis. It can be triggered by tumors, infections, or it may be cryptogenic. The neurological manifestations can be either acute or subacute and usually develop within six weeks. The clinical manifestations include behavioral and psychiatric symptoms, autonomic disturbances, movement disorders, and seizures.

Autoimmune encephalitis can result from a number of autoimmune diseases including:

- Rasmussen encephalitis
- Systemic lupus erythematosus
- Behçet's disease
- Hashimoto's encephalopathy
- Autoimmune limbic encephalitis
- Sydenham's chorea

The severity of the condition can be monitored using the Modified Rankin Scale and the clinical assessment scale in autoimmune encephalitis (CASE) score.

== Signs and symptoms ==
Patients with AIE may present movement disorders such as ataxia, dystonia, myoclonus, and orofacial dyskinesia. Seizures are the most common symptom and different types of seizures may be seen, including refractory status epilepticus. Autonomic disturbances such as sweating, hypertension, tachycardia and hypoventilation are also frequent. Some patients may develop gastrointestinal manifestations (diarrhea, gastroparesis, and constipation) due to involvement of the myenteric plexus. Sleep disturbances such as insomnia, abnormal sleep movements, sleep apnea, and hypersomnia are also found.

Some of these findings are suggestive of certain types of encephalitis and may indicate a specific underlying antibody or tumor.

== Mechanism ==
Autoimmune encephalitis commonly presents an immune response against neuronal autoantigens with production of antibodies. Anti-neuronal antibodies are classified into antibodies against cell surface antigens (CSAab), antibodies against synaptic antigens (SyAab) and antibodies against intraneuronal antigens (INAab), also known as onconeural antibodies.

== Diagnosis ==
Diagnostic criteria for possible autoimmune encephalitis (all three of the following criteria met):

1. Subacute onset (rapid progression of less than three months) of working memory deficits (short-term memory loss), altered mental status (decreased level of consciousness, lethargy or personality changes), or psychiatric symptoms
2. At least one of the following:
  - New focal central nervous system findings
  - Seizures not explained by previously-known seizure disorder
  - Cerebrospinal fluid pleocytosis
  - Magnetic resonance imaging suggestive of encephalitis
  - Seizures not explained by a previously known seizure disorder. In such cases, an electroencephalogram (EEG) can be a valuable tool to assess brain electrical activity and identify patterns consistent with seizure disorders or encephalopathy, further supporting the suspicion of autoimmune encephalitis.
3. Reasonable exclusion of alternative causes

Criteria for autoantibody-negative but probable autoimmune encephalitis (all four criteria met):

1. Subacute onset (rapid progression of less than three months) of working memory deficits (short-term memory loss), altered mental status (decreased level of consciousness, lethargy or personality changes), or psychiatric symptoms
2. Exclusion of well-defined syndromes of autoimmune encephalitis (typical limbic encephalitis, Bickerstaff brainstem encephalitis, acute disseminated encephalomyelitis)
3. Absence of well-characterized autoantibodies in blood serum and cerebrospinal fluid, and at least two of the following criteria:
  - Magnetic resonance imaging suggestive of encephalitis
  - CSF pleocytosis, oligoclonal bands or elevated cerebrospinal fluid IgG index, or both
  - Brain biopsy showing inflammatory infiltrates and excluding other disorders
4. Reasonable exclusion of alternative causes

== Classification ==
=== Anti-NMDAR encephalitis ===
Anti-N-methyl-D-aspartate receptor encephalitis is one of the most common causes of AIE and was originally described in 2007 in a cohort of 12 patients, 11 of them with ovarian teratomas. This condition predominantly affects children and young female patients. Underlying malignancies are found mainly in patients between the age of 12–45 years; most of them are ovarian teratomas (94%), followed by extraovarian teratomas (2%), and other tumors (4%). Herpes simplex virus-1 encephalitis appears to be a trigger for anti-NMDAR encephalitis; most AIE cases after herpes zoster are now believed to be anti-NMDAR encephalitis.

=== Anti-AMPAR encephalitis ===
Patients with anti-Α-Amino-3-hydroxy-5-methyl-4-isoxazolepropionic acid receptor (anti-AMPAR) encephalitis characteristically present with seizures, memory impairment and psychosis. Some may develop sleep disturbances and movement disorders. Anti-AMPAR encephalitis is paraneoplastic in etiology in 64% of cases, mostly associated with thymoma, ovarian teratoma and lung and breast cancer. Brain MRI shows T2 and FLAIR hyperintensities, particularly in the medial temporal lobe. Lesions in the brain cortex or subcortex, sometimes with demyelination, may also be found. Cerebrospinal fluid (CSF) examination may show pleocytosis and oligoclonal bands.

=== Anti-GABA encephalitis ===
==== Anti-GABA-AR encephalitis ====
Anti-gamma-aminobutyric acid A receptor (anti-GABA-AR) encephalitis was first reported in 2014 in six patients (two male children, one female teenager and three male adults). They developed a rapidly progressive encephalopathy with early behavioral or cognitive changes that evolved with refractory seizures and multifocal lesions as seen on brain magnetic resonance imaging. In most of these patients, CSF analysis showed lymphocytic pleocytosis. A recent study identified an underlying neoplasia in 27% of these patients, mostly thymomas. Similar to that seen in patients with anti-gamma-aminobutyric acid B receptor (GABA-BR) and anti-AMPAR antibodies, they may also present with coexisting autoimmune disorders such as thyroiditis or myasthenia.

==== Anti-GABA-BR encephalitis ====
Anti-GABA-BR encephalitis is characterized by cognitive symptoms with severe seizures or status epilepticus. Other presentations include ataxia and opsoclonus-myoclonus. In a small series of 20 patients with anti-GABA-BR, about 50% were found to have small-cell lung cancer. Males and females appear to be equally affected. The long-term prognosis in anti-GABA-BR encephalitis is determined by the presence of an underlying malignancy.

=== Anti-LGI1 and anti-CASPR2 encephalitis ===
The first reports of anti-voltage-gated potassium channel-complex antibodies (anti-VGKC) date back to 2001 and described patients with neuromyotonia, Morvan's syndrome and limbic encephalitis. Other rare phenotypes included epilepsy and painful polyneuropathy. Anti-VGKC antibodies, in fact, later turned out to be directed against proteins that form a complex with VGKC called leucine-rich glioma-inactivated 1 (LGI1) and contactin-associated protein-like 2 (CASPR-2). Each of these antibodies lead to specific clinical symptoms.

=== Anti-GAD encephalitis ===
Glutamic acid decarboxylase (GAD) is an enzyme that catalyzes the conversion of glutamic acid to the neurotransmitter GABA. Anti-GAD antibodies have been associated with other autoimmune disorders such as insulin-dependent diabetes mellitus. The main neurological syndromes associated with anti-GAD antibodies include stiff-person syndrome, cerebellar ataxia, epilepsy and limbic encephalitis.

=== Anti-GlyR encephalitis ===
Glycine receptors (GlyR) are chloride channels that facilitate inhibitory neurotransmission in the brain and spinal cord. Anti-GlyR antibodies were first described in patients with progressive encephalomyelitis with rigidity and myoclonus and later in patients with stiff-person syndrome. Recently, anti-GlyR antibodies have also been reported in patients with cerebellar ataxia and anti-GAD antibodies and patients with demyelinating diseases including optic neuritis and multiple sclerosis, but their clinical significance remains unclear. Anti-GlyR antibodies are usually not associated with tumors, although there have been reports of patients with underlying thymoma, small-cell lung cancer, breast cancer and chronic lymphocytic leukemia.

=== Anti-DPPX encephalitis ===
Dipeptidyl peptidase-like protein 6 (DPPX) is a subunit of Kv4.2 potassium channels expressed in the hippocampus, cerebellum, striatum, and myenteric plexus. Patients with anti-DPPX antibodies show neuropsychiatric symptoms (agitation and confusion), myoclonus, tremor, startle reflex, seizures, stiff-person syndrome and prodromal diarrhea of unknown etiology. In addition, they may have symptoms of dysautonomia including arrhythmias, thermodysregulation, diaphoresis, urinary symptoms and sleep disorders.

=== Encephalopathy associated with anti-IgLON5 antibodies ===
The IgLON family member 5 (IgLON5) is a neuronal cell adhesion molecule of the immunoglobulin superfamily. Patients with anti-IgLON5 antibodies present with a unique non-REM (rapid eye movement) and REM parasomnia with obstructive sleep apnea, stridor, episodic central hypoventilation, dementia, gait instability, chorea, dysarthria, dysphagia, dysautonomia and supranuclear gaze palsy resembling that seen in classic tauopathy. All published cases reported the presence of the alleles HLA-DQB1*0501 and HLA-DRB1*1001 suggesting genetic susceptibility to this disease. Neuropathological postmortem studies have shown a novel tauopathy with extensive neuronal deposits of hyperphosphorylated tau mainly involving the tegmentum of the brainstem and hypothalamus. This novel encephalopathy provides an intriguing link between neurodegeneration and cell-surface autoimmunity. A recent study has shown that anti-IgLON5 antibodies recognize Ig-like domain 2 as an immunogenic region and causes irreversible internalization of IgLON5 from the neuronal membrane. These findings support a potential pathogenic role of anti-IgLON5 antibodies in the associated encephalopathy.

=== Anti-mGluR1 and anti-mGluR5 encephalitis ===
Metabotropic glutamate receptor 1 (mGluR1) and metabotropic glutamate receptor 5 (mGluR5) are both G-protein-coupled receptors that share an 85% amino acid sequence homology. Both receptors are involved in modulating synaptic functions including the electrical change in neuronal response called long-term depression (a term not related to the mood-changing disorder major depression). While mGluR1 facilitates long-term depression at parallel fiber to Purkinje cell synapses, which are critical for cerebellar motor learning, mGluR5 is more relevant for long-term depression in the hippocampus.

All patients with anti-mGluR1 antibodies develop cerebellar ataxia of subacute onset, and some may present with additional symptoms such as paranoia, dysgeusia, diplopia and cognitive deficits. Common tumors found to be associated with anti-mGluR1 antibodies are hematologic malignancies and prostate adenocarcinoma.

Patients with anti-mGluR5-abs present with a form of encephalitis named "Ophelia syndrome", a clinical syndrome that includes memory loss and psychosis in association with Hodgkin's lymphoma. The outcome of reported cases is generally good after treatment of the lymphoma and immunotherapy.

=== Seronegative autoimmune encephalitis ===
Autoimmune encephalitis might occur without the identification of any pathogenic antibody, in which case it is called seronegative autoimmune encephalitis.

It can be further categorized in three subtypes: antibody-negative probable autoimmune encephalitis, autoimmune limbic encephalitis and acute disseminated encephalomyelitis.

One therapeutic approach to seronegative autoimmune encephalitis is using as a first-line treatment corticosteroids and intravenous immunoglobulin.Other options include the use of rituximab (second-line) and tocilizumab or cyclophosphamide (next-line).

A study in a South Korean hospital with 142 patients identified 5 factors that should be considered when evaluating the disease:

- Presence of refractory status epilepticus
- Advanced age of onset (over or equal to 60 years)
- Having the subtype of probable AE (ANPRA)
- Infra-tentorium involvement in brain magnetic resonance imaging
- Delay of immunotherapy of more than 1 month

The less of those factors are present, the better the chance of good recovery in a 2-year period.

== Treatments ==
=== Lines of treatment ===
Treatments for autoimmune encephalitis are separated into three lines: first, second, and last-line. First-line treatments are intended to reduce inflammation and neutralize autoantibodies, while having mild but manageable side effects. If the first-line treatment are not effective, second-line treatments are used. Second-line treatments are more aggressive and are more focused on suppressing the immune system. Last-line treatments are typically reserved only for refractory cases of autoimmune encephalitis that have not responded to first or second-line therapies and involve higher risk treatments.

=== First-line treatments ===
==== Immunoglobulin therapy ====
Immunoglobulin therapy is used as a first line immunotherapy to treat autoimmune encephalitis by introducing donor immunoglobulin via intravenous infusion (IVIg). IVIg treats autoimmune encephalitis by modulating the immune system. This involves reducing inflammation and neutralizing autoantibodies. Depending on patient stability, infusions can be given inpatient or outpatient. IVIg infusion times typically take under six hours and vary depending on rate and volume of infusion. Side effects of IVIg are generally mild and may include a fever, headache, and allergic reaction.

==== Corticosteroid therapy ====
Corticosteroids are first-line treatments for autoimmune encephalitis. Steroids like methylprednisolone promote the expression of cytokines that are responsible for anti-inflammatory processes. Corticosteroids additionally work to inhibit the migration of immune cells into the central nervous system, which helps to limit damage from inflammation. In the acute phase of autoimmune encephalitis, steroids are administered intravenously in high doses and then switched to a tapering oral regimen. Side effects vary by steroid, but may include weight gain, hyperglycemia, and susceptibility to infection.

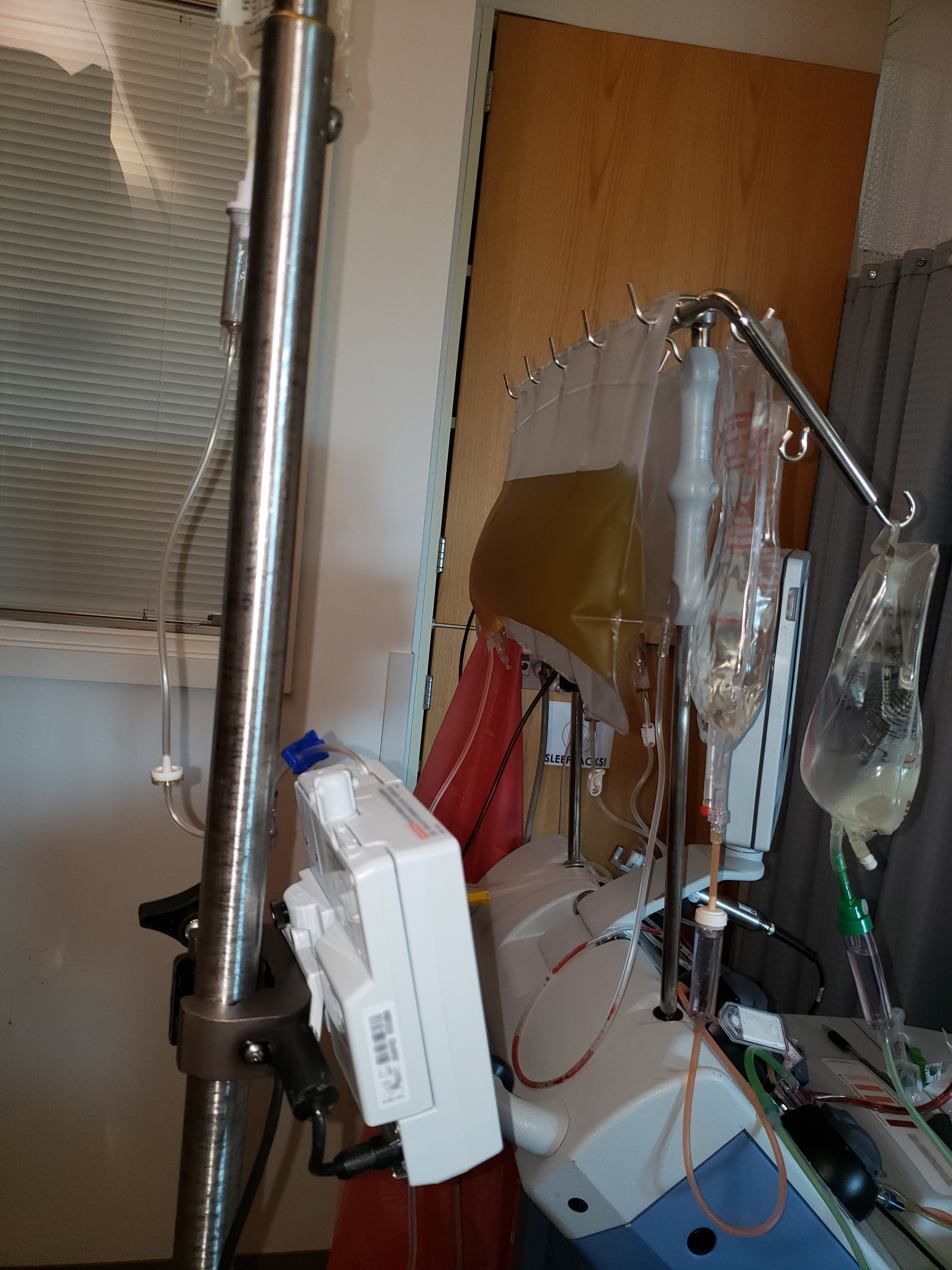
Plasma containing autoantibodies separated from the blood of a patient with autoimmune encephalitis using a TPE machine

==== Plasmapheresis ====
Plasmapheresis, also called plasma exchange (PLEX) or therapeutic plasma exchange (TPE) is the use of an apheresis machine which separates the different components of blood, the platelets, plasma, red blood cells, and white blood cells. It works to treat autoimmune encephalitis by filtering pathogenic autoantibodies and removing them from the body, while replacing with donor plasma or albumin. Plasmapheresis is typically used in conjunction with other treatments such as steroids or immunotherapy. PLEX for autoimmune encephalitis is commonly administered inpatient using a central venous catheter over the period of 1-2 weeks.

=== Second-line treatments ===
==== Immunosuppression ====
Immunosuppressive drugs are used as second line therapies to treat or maintain autoimmune encephalitis when first-line treatments are not effective. These drugs treat autoimmune encephalitis by targeting and neutralizing immune cells like T and B lymphocytes. Rituximab is used in antibody-mediated forms of autoimmune encephalitis and works by depleting B lymphocytes and is administered intravenously with mild side effects, but infusion reactions and post-treatment infections may occur. Cyclophosphamide, a form of chemotherapy, suppresses B and T lymphocytes, but is known to have moderate side effects such as infertility and alopecia. For autoimmune encephalitis, cyclophosphamide is typically administered intravenously.

=== Last-line treatments ===
==== Stem cell transplant ====
An autologous hematopoietic stem cell transplant (HSCT) is classified as a last-line treatment for autoimmune encephalitis that does not respond to first- or second-line treatments. This treatment involves the collection of hematopoietic stem cells from the patient prior to high doses of immunoablative chemotherapy, which neutralizes all immune cells. The stem cells removed prior to the chemotherapy are reinfused to regenerate the immune system without autoantibodies. Stem cell transplants are considered to be effective, but have significant risks, including severe opportunistic infections, fertility issues, cancer, and mortality.

== See also ==
- Encephalitis
- Viral encephalitis
