= Benign fasciculation syndrome =

Involuntary muscle twitching in the voluntary muscles

- Other names: Fasciculation Not Otherwise Specified
- Animated image of benign fasciculation syndrome in the upper eyelid of a 19-year-old male. Symptoms subsided several days later.
- Specialty: Neurology, psychiatry
- Prognosis: Good–excellent

Benign fasciculation syndrome (BFS) is characterized by fasciculation (twitching) of voluntary muscles in the body. The twitching can occur in any voluntary muscle group but is most common in the eyelids, arms, hands, fingers, legs, and feet. The tongue can also be affected. The twitching may be occasional to continuous. BFS must be distinguished from other conditions that include muscle twitches.

== Signs and symptoms ==
The main symptom of benign fasciculation syndrome is focal or widespread involuntary muscle activity. The benign twitches usually have a constant location.

Other common symptoms are generalized fatigue or weakness, paraesthesia or numbness, and muscle cramping or spasms. Anxiety and somatic symptom disorders and symptoms are commonly reported. Muscle stiffness may also be present; if muscle weakness is not also present, and cramps are more severe, the stiffness may be categorized instead as cramp fasciculation syndrome. Cramp fasciculation is a variant of BFS which presents with muscle pain and exercise intolerance.

== Causes ==
Health anxiety disorder may be a cause among individuals who become concerned they have a motor neuron disease; this persistent concern is a psychiatric condition mostly noted among healthcare professionals and doctors. An association with anxiety level is established; BFS is reportedly found among "anxious medical students" and clinicians under the age of 40, and this phenomenon known as "fasciculation anxiety syndrome" is reinforced by access to information on the internet.

Fasciculations can be caused or worsened by intense and long periods of daily exercise.

BFS can also be caused by long-term use of anticholinergics, and fasciculations may be caused by other drug use or exposure to steroids, nicotine, caffeine, alcohol, insecticides and pesticides. Thyroid disease may also cause similar symptoms.

Fasciculations can also be caused by deficiencies of magnesium, calcium.

== Diagnosis ==
Benign fasciculation syndrome is a diagnosis of exclusion; that is, other potential causes for the twitching must be ruled out before BFS can be diagnosed. Diagnosis includes blood tests, a neurological exam, and electromyography (EMG).

Another step in diagnosing BFS is checking for clinical weakness or wasting, which are found in more serious conditions. Lack of clinical weakness along with normal EMG results (in those with only fasciculations) largely eliminates more serious disorders from potential diagnosis. In younger people with only lower motor neuron (LMN) fasciculations, no muscle weakness, and no thyroid abnormalities, Turner and Talbot (2013) state that "individuals under 40 years can be reassured without resorting to electromyography (EMG) to avoid the small but highly damaging possibility of false-positives".

According to Kincaid (1997), the diagnosis is made when there is no clinical finding of neurogenic disease; he first reassures patients that no "ominous disease seems to be present", and says, "I suggest that patients like this be followed for a year or longer with clinical and electromyographic exams at about 6-month intervals before one becomes secure in the diagnosis that the fasciculations are truly benign." Other publications recommend followups for four or five years before ruling the condition benign, although the percentage of individuals who progress to a more serious condition is very low.

=== Classification ===
Benign fasciculation syndrome and the variant cramp fasciculation syndrome "can be regarded as part of a larger spectrum of disease that also incorporates acquired auto-immune neuromyotonia.

=== Differential ===
Other serious diseases that must be distinguished include motor neuron diseases (MND) such as amyotrophic lateral sclerosis (ALS), neuropathy, and spinal cord diseases.

According to Turner and Talbot (2013), "the fasciculations of MND are often abrupt and widespread at onset in an individual previously unaffected by fasciculations in youth. The site of the fasciculations, for example, those in the calves versus abdomen, has not been shown to be discriminatory for a benign disorder. There is conflicting evidence as to whether the character of fasciculations differs neurophysiologically in MND." It is "exceptionally rare for patients later diagnosed with ALS to present with fasciculations alone", and ALS is ruled out with a normal EMG and no evidence of muscle wasting.

== Treatment ==
There is support for treating any accompanying anxiety using cognitive behavioral therapy or antidepressants. Quinine is effective, but not recommended because of the potential for serious side effects. Calcium channel blockers may be effective, although the evidence for their use is weak. There is little evidence supporting other therapies.

In cases caused by magnesium or calcium deficiencies, curing the deficiency through diet or supplementation is effective.

The prognosis for those with BFS is good.

== Research ==
There may be an association between widespread fasciculations or paresthesias with small fiber neuropathy.

A 2017 study in Neurology also found that benign fasciculations are common in the general population, occurring in about 70% of healthy individuals and almost never associated with a serious neuromuscular disorder. Of patients that enrolled in a 1, 3, 6, 12 and 24 month study, perceived weakness was reported in 35.3%, 47.1% experienced numbness, 70.6% had tingling, cramps were present in 64.7% and after 24 months, only 5% had their symptoms resolved. Of all the patients, none developed motor neuron disease.
