= List of thalidomide side effects =

Adverse effects by frequency:

Note that teratogenicity is not discussed here as it is not considered a side effect. For information regarding birth defects, see thalidomide.

== Very common (may affect more than 1 in 10 people) ==
- Somnolence (drowsiness; ~40%)
- Edema (~60%)
- Hypotension (low blood pressure)
- Headache
- Haematuria (blood in the urine)
- Arthralgia (joint pain)
- Myalgia (muscle aches)
- Increased bilirubin
- Neutropenia (~30%)
- Leucopenia (~15-40%)
- Lymphopenia
- Constipation
- Peripheral neuropathy^{†}
- Dizziness
- Paraesthesia
- Dysaesthesia

== Common (may affect up to 1 in 10 people) ==
- Pulmonary embolism
- Vomiting
- Dry mouth
- Toxic skin eruption
- Dry skin
- Rash
- Urticaria (hives)
- Pyrexia (fever)
- Asthenia
- Interstitial lung disease
- Heart failure
- Depression
- Pneumonia

== Uncommon (may affect up to 1 in 100 people) ==
- Shortness of breath
- Tremor

== Rare (may affect up to 1 in 1,000 people) ==
- Increased appetite
- Bradycardia (low heart rate)
- Tachycardia (high heart rate)
- Cardiac arrhythmia
- Malaise
- Deep vein thrombosis

== Very rare (may affect up to 1 in 10,000 people) ==
- Thrombocytopenia
- Anaemia
- Hypothyroidism
- Reduced libido
- Confusion
- Seizures
- Orthostatic hypotension
- Thromboembolic events
- Bronchospasm
- Intestinal obstruction
- Pruritus (itchiness)
- Stevens–Johnson syndrome
- Toxic epidermal necrolysis
- Facial oedema
- Photosensitivity (light sensitivity)
- Menstruation abnormalities

† Peripheral neuropathy may be irreversible and usually results from chronic (usually a matter of months) exposure to thalidomide.
