= Fibrillation =

Rapid, irregular contraction of muscle fibers

Fibrillation is the rapid, irregular, and unsynchronized contraction of muscle fibers. An important occurrence is with regard to the heart.

== Cardiology ==
There are two major classes of cardiac fibrillation: atrial fibrillation and ventricular fibrillation.

- Atrial fibrillation is an irregular and uncoordinated contraction of the cardiac muscle of atria. It can be a chronic condition, usually treated with anticoagulation and sometimes with conversion to normal sinus rhythm. In this condition the normal electrical pulses coming from the sinoatrial node are overwhelmed by disorganized electrical impulses usually originating in the roots of the pulmonary veins, leading to irregular conduction of impulses to the ventricles which generate the heartbeat.
- Ventricular fibrillation is an irregular and uncoordinated contraction of the cardiac muscle of ventricles. It is a common cause of cardiac arrest and is usually fatal if not reversed by defibrillation.

Fibrillation may sometimes be used after heart surgery to stop the heart from beating while any minor leaks are stitched up.

== Musculoskeletal ==
Fibrillation also occurs with individual skeletal muscle fibers. This happens when muscle fibers lose contact with their innervating axon producing a spontaneous action potential, "fibrillation potential" that results in the muscle fiber's contraction. These contractions are not visible under the skin and are detectable through needle electromyography (EMG) and ultrasound. Fibrillations can occur in healthy individuals. If the fibrillations have irregular potentials, then they don't have pathological significance. In other cases they are a major symptom in acute and severe peripheral nerve disorders, in myopathies in which muscle fibers are split or inflamed, and in lower motor neuron lesions.

They contrast with fasciculations that are visible spontaneous contractions involving small groups of muscle fibers. Fasciculations can be seen in lower motor neuron lesions as well, but they also do not necessarily denote pathology.

== Terminology ==
The word fibrillation (/ˌfɪbrɪlˈeɪʃən/) is related to the word fibril in the sense of muscle fibrils, the proteins that make up each muscle fiber (muscle cell).
