= LGI1 =

Protein-coding gene in the species Homo sapiens

Identifiers
- Aliases: LGI1, ADLTE, ADPAEF, ADPEAF, EPITEMPIN, EPT, ETL1, IB1099, leucine-rich, glioma inactivated 1, leucine rich glioma inactivated 1
- External IDs: OMIM: 604619; MGI: 1861691; GeneCards: LGI1

Gene location (Human)
Chr.	Chromosome 10 (human)
Band	10q23.33	Start	93,757,840 bp
Band	10q23.33	End	93,806,272 bp

Gene location (Mouse)
Chr.	Chromosome 19 (mouse)
Band	19|19 C3	Start	38,252,984 bp
Band	19|19 C3	End	38,300,662 bp
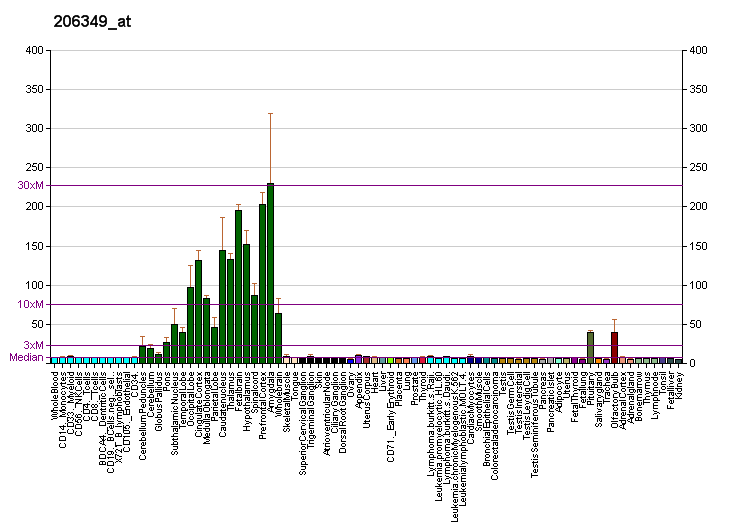
RNA expression pattern
Bgee	Human / Mouse (ortholog); Top expressed in: pons; Brodmann area 23; endothelial cell; caudate nucleus; putamen; middle temporal gyrus; Epithelium of choroid plexus; nucleus accumbens; lateral nuclear group of thalamus; superior frontal gyrus / Top expressed in: dentate gyrus; dentate gyrus of hippocampal formation granule cell; hippocampus proper; primary visual cortex; temporal lobe; amygdala; superior frontal gyrus; subdivision of hippocampus; subiculum; Region I of hippocampus proper; More reference expression data
BioGPS	More reference expression data
Gene ontology
Molecular function	signaling receptor binding; protein binding
Cellular component	extracellular region; cell junction; synapse; extracellular space; membrane; synaptic cleft; glutamatergic synapse
Biological process	positive regulation of cell growth; cell population proliferation; neuron projection development; positive regulation of synaptic transmission; protein homooligomerization; nervous system development; axon guidance; neurotransmitter receptor localization to postsynaptic specialization membrane
Sources:Amigo / QuickGO
Orthologs
Databases	NCBI: entry; OMA: entry
Species	Human	Mouse
Entrez	9211	56839
Ensembl	ENSG00000108231	ENSMUSG00000067242
UniProt	O95970	Q9JIA1
RefSeq (mRNA)	NM_001308275; NM_001308276; NM_005097	NM_020278
RefSeq (protein)	NP_001295204; NP_001295205; NP_005088	NP_064674
Location (UCSC)	Chr 10: 93.76 – 93.81 Mb	Chr 19: 38.25 – 38.3 Mb
PubMed search
- Wikidata
View/Edit Human	View/Edit Mouse

Leucine-rich, glioma inactivated 1, also known as LGI1, is a protein which in humans is encoded by the LGI1 gene. It may be a metastasis suppressor.

== Function ==
The leucine-rich glioma inactivated -1 gene is rearranged as a result of translocations in glioblastoma cell lines. The protein contains a hydrophobic segment representing a putative transmembrane domain with the amino terminus located outside the cell. It also contains leucine-rich repeats with conserved cysteine-rich flanking sequences. This gene is predominantly expressed in neural tissues and its expression is reduced in low grade brain tumors and significantly reduced or absent in malignant gliomas.

== Clinical significance ==
Since its earliest discovery, the LGI1 gene has been implicated in the control of cancer metastasis and in a predisposition to epilepsy. Following genetic linkage studies placing the hereditary form of autosomal dominant partial epilepsy with auditory features (ADPEAF) on chromosome region 10q24 mutation analysis of affected members in these families demonstrated LGI1 was a major cause of the disease.

More recently, LGI1 has been shown to be the major target of human autoantibodies which immunoprecipitate voltage-gated potassium channel complexes from mammalian brain tissue. LGI1 antibodies are found in patients with limbic encephalitis and in patients with faciobrachial dystonic seizures (FBDS). FBDS are a recently described form of epilepsy which is characterized by frequent, brief seizures which affect the arm and face. They appear to be preferentially responsive to immunotherapy over anti-epileptic drugs.

== Interactions ==
LGI1 has been shown to interact with ADAM22, and DLG4.
