= Myokymia =

Involuntary quivering of a muscle

- Specialty: Neurology

Myokymia is an involuntary, spontaneous, localized quivering of a few muscles, or bundles within a muscle, but which are insufficient to move a joint. One type is superior oblique myokymia.

Myokymia is commonly used to describe an involuntary eyelid muscle contraction, typically involving the lower eyelid or less often the upper eyelid. It occurs in normal individuals and typically starts and disappears spontaneously. However, it can sometimes last up to three weeks. Since the condition typically resolves itself, medical professionals do not consider it to be serious or a cause for concern.

In contrast, facial myokymia is a fine rippling of muscles on one side of the face and may reflect an underlying tumor in the brainstem (typically a brainstem glioma), loss of myelin in the brainstem (associated with multiple sclerosis) or in the recovery stage of Miller-Fisher syndrome, a variant of Guillain–Barré syndrome, an inflammatory polyneuropathy that may affect the facial nerve.

Myokymia in otherwise unrelated body parts may occur in neuromyotonia.

== Causes ==
=== Benign eyelid myokymia ===
Common contributing factors for benign, transient eyelid myokymia include:

- Digital screen time – A case-control study found significantly higher screen time in patients with eyelid myokymia (mean 6.88 hours vs 4.84 hours in controls) with a strong dose–response relationship (r = 0.670).
- Caffeine intake – Higher caffeine consumption has been associated with eyelid myokymia.
- Fatigue and poor sleep quality – Fatigue and poor sleep are significantly more prevalent in affected individuals.

==== Medications ====
Eyelid myokymia has been reported as a side effect of topiramate, resolving completely upon discontinuation of the medication.

==== Magnesium ====
Although magnesium deficiency is commonly suggested as a cause, two cross-sectional studies found no association between serum magnesium levels and benign eyelid myokymia. Severe hypomagnesemia can cause widespread neuromuscular excitability, cramps, and tetany, but this is distinct from isolated eyelid twitching.

=== Facial or persistent myokymia ===
Facial myokymia, or eyelid myokymia that is persistent or progressive, may indicate underlying neurological disease:

- Multiple sclerosis – Facial myokymia is a recognized feature of multiple sclerosis; 92% of patients with continuous facial myokymia have pontine lesions on MRI. Eyelid myokymia may rarely be a presenting symptom.
- Brainstem lesions – Persistent facial myokymia can be a pathognomonic sign of intrinsic brainstem lesions, including pontine glioma.
- Neuromyotonia – Myokymia may occur in neuromyotonia (Isaacs syndrome).

=== Superior oblique myokymia ===
Superior oblique myokymia is a distinct entity caused by neurovascular compression of the trochlear nerve.

== Treatment ==
Many doctors commonly recommend a combined treatment of a warm compress applied to the eyes (to relieve muscle tension, relax the muscles, and reduce swelling), a small dosage of antihistamine (to reduce any swelling that may be caused by an allergic reaction), increased bed rest and decreased exposure to computer screens, televisions, and harsh lighting (to allow muscles to rest), and monitoring caffeine intake (as too much caffeine can cause an adverse reaction such as eye twitching, but a controlled dose can serve as an effective treatment by increasing blood flow).

== Etymology ==
The term comes from the Greek -mŷs – "muscle," + kŷm, -kŷmia – "something swollen" or -kŷmos – "wave".

== See also ==
- Blepharospasm
- Carnitine palmitoyltransferase II deficiency
- Fasciculation
- Myoclonic jerk (myoclonus)
