= Fasciculation =

Spontaneous, involuntary muscle twitch

- Other names: Muscle twitch
- Animated image showing involuntary twitching in the upper eyelid of a young adult male
- Pronunciation: /fəˌsɪkjʊˈleɪʃən/
- Specialty: Neurology

A fasciculation, or muscle twitch, is a spontaneous, involuntary muscle contraction and relaxation, involving fine muscle fibers. They are common, with as many as 70% of people experiencing them. They can be benign, or associated with more serious conditions. When no cause or pathology is identified, they are diagnosed as benign fasciculation syndrome.

== Diagnosis ==
Fasciculations can be detected by electromyography (EMG). Surface EMG is more sensitive than needle electromyography and clinical observation in the detection of fasciculation in people with amyotrophic lateral sclerosis (ALS).

Deeper areas of contraction can be detected by electromyography (EMG) testing, though they can happen in any skeletal muscle in the body. Fasciculations arise as a result of spontaneous depolarization of a lower motor neuron leading to the synchronous contraction of all the skeletal muscle fibers within a single motor unit. An example of normal spontaneous depolarization is the constant contractions of cardiac muscle, causing the heart to beat. Usually, intentional movement of the involved muscle causes fasciculations to cease immediately, but they may return once the muscle is at rest again.

Tics must also be distinguished from fasciculations. Small twitches of the upper or lower eyelid, for example, are not tics, because they do not involve a whole muscle, but rather are unsuppressible twitches of a few muscle fiber bundles.

== Causes ==
Fasciculations have a variety of causes, the majority of which are benign, but can also be due to disease of the motor neurons. They are encountered by up to 70% of all healthy people, though for most, it is quite infrequent. In some cases, the presence of fasciculations can be annoying and interfere with quality of life. If a neurological examination is otherwise normal and EMG testing does not indicate any additional pathology, a diagnosis of benign fasciculation syndrome is usually made.

=== Risk factors ===
Risk factors for benign fasciculations are age, stress, fatigue, and strenuous exercise. Fasciculations can be caused by anxiety, caffeine or alcohol and thyroid disease.

Other factors may include the use of anticholinergic drugs over long periods. In particular, these include ethanolamines such as diphenhydramine (brand names Benadryl, Dimedrol, Daedalon and Nytol), used as an antihistamine and sedative, and dimenhydrinate (brand names Dramamine, Driminate, Gravol, Gravamin, Vomex, and Vertirosan) for nausea and motion sickness. Persons with benign fasciculation syndrome (BFS) may experience paraesthesia (especially numbness) shortly after taking such medication; fasciculation episodes begin as the medication wears off.

Stimulants can cause fasciculations directly. These include caffeine, pseudoephedrine (Sudafed), amphetamines, and the asthma bronchodilator salbutamol (brand names Proventil, Combivent, Ventolin). Medications used to treat attention deficit disorder (ADHD) often contain stimulants and are common causes of benign fasciculations.

The depolarizing neuromuscular blocker succinylcholine causes fasciculations. It is a normal side effect of the drug's administration. It can be prevented with a small dose of a nondepolarizing neuromuscular blocker prior to the administration of succinylcholine, often 10% of a nondepolarizing NMB's induction dose.

Even if a drug such as caffeine may be suspected to cause fasciculations, that does not necessarily mean it is the actual cause. For example, a very slight magnesium deficiency by itself might not be enough for fasciculations to occur, but when combined with caffeine, the two factors together could be enough.

== Treatment ==
There is no proven treatment for fasciculations in people with ALS. Among patients with ALS, fasciculation frequency is not associated with the duration of ALS and is independent of the degree of limb weakness and limb atrophy. No prediction of ALS disease duration can be made based on fasciculation frequency alone.

== Epidemiology ==
Fasciculations are observed more often in males, and clinicians are overrepresented in study samples.

== See also ==
- Blepharospasm
- Carnitine palmitoyltransferase II deficiency
- Myokymia
- Fibrillation
- Myoclonus
- Seizure and convulsion
- Tremor
- Twitch (disambiguation)
