= Limbic encephalitis =

Inflammation involving the limbic system in the brain

- The limbic system within the brain
- Specialty: Neurology

Limbic encephalitis is a form of encephalitis, a disease characterized by inflammation of the brain. Limbic encephalitis is caused by autoimmunity: an abnormal state where the body produces antibodies against itself. Some cases are associated with cancer and some are not. Although the disease is known as "limbic" encephalitis, it is seldom limited to the limbic system and post-mortem studies usually show involvement of other parts of the brain. The disease was first described by Brierley and others in 1960 as a series of three cases. The link to cancer was first noted in 1968 and confirmed by later investigators.

The majority of cases of limbic encephalitis are associated with a tumor (diagnosed or undiagnosed). In cases caused by tumor, recovery can only occur following complete removal of the tumor, which is not always possible. Limbic encephalitis is classified according to the auto-antibody that causes the disease. The most common types are:

- Anti-Hu, which is associated with small-cell carcinoma of the lungs.
- Anti-Ma2, associated with germ-cell tumours of the testis.
- Anti-NMDAR, associated with tumors of the ovaries, commonly teratomata.

Since 1999, following the publication of a case report of a 15-year-old teenager of Indian descent from South Africa who developed subacute memory loss subsequent to herpes simplex type 1 encephalitis, similar cases of non-paraneoplastic LE have been described, as has its association with auto-antibodies and response to steroid. Limbic encephalitis associated with voltage-gated potassium channel antibodies (VGKC-Abs) may frequently be non-paraneoplastic. A recent study of 15 cases of limbic encephalitis found raised VGKC-Abs associated with non-paraneoplastic disorders and remission following immunosuppressive treatment.

== Classification ==
Limbic encephalitis is broadly grouped into two types: paraneoplastic limbic encephalitis and non-paraneoplastic limbic encephalitis.

- Paraneoplastic limbic encephalitis (PNLE) is caused by cancer or tumor, and may be treated by removal of the tumor.
- Non-paraneoplastic limbic encephalitis (NPLE) is not associated with cancer. More common than PNLE, it is caused by an infection, auto-immune disorder, or other condition that may never be identified.

== Symptoms and signs ==
Symptoms develop over days or weeks. The subacute development of short-term memory deficits is considered the hallmark of this disease, but this symptom is often overlooked, because it is overshadowed by other more obvious symptoms such as headache, irritability, sleep disturbance, delusions, hallucinations, agitation, seizures and psychosis, or because the other symptoms mean the patient has to be sedated, and it is not possible to test memory in a sedated patient.

== Cause ==
Limbic encephalitis is associated with an autoimmune reaction. In non-paraneoplastic limbic encephalitis, this is typically due to infection (commonly herpes simplex virus) or as a systemic autoimmune disorder. Limbic encephalitis associated with cancer or tumors is called paraneoplastic limbic encephalitis.

== Diagnosis ==
The diagnosis of limbic encephalitis is extremely difficult and it is usual for the diagnosis to be delayed for weeks. The key diagnostic test (detection of specific auto-antibodies in cerebrospinal fluid) is not routinely offered by most immunology laboratories. Some of the rarer auto-antibodies (e.g., NMDAR) have no commercially available assay and can only be measured by a very small number of research laboratories worldwide, further delaying diagnosis by weeks or months. Most patients with limbic encephalitis are initially diagnosed with herpes simplex encephalitis, because the two syndromes cannot be distinguished clinically. HHV-6 (human herpes virus 6) encephalitis is also clinically indistinguishable from limbic encephalitis.

There are two sets of diagnostic criteria used. The oldest are those proposed by Gultekin et al. in 2000.

Gultekin criteria
EITHER, Pathological demonstration of limbic encephalitis
OR, All four of:
- Short-term memory loss, seizures, or psychiatric symptoms suggestive of limbic system involvement
- <4 years between onset of neurological symptoms and cancer diagnosis
- Exclusion of metastases, infection, metabolic and nutritional deficits, stroke and side-effects of therapy that may cause limbic encephalopathy
- At least one of
  - CSF with inflammatory findings
  - Hyperintensity of the temporal lobes bilaterally on MRI FLAIR or T2
  - EEG with epilepsy or slow activity involving the temporal lobes focally

A revised set of criteria were proposed by Graus and Saiz in 2005.

Graus and Saiz criteria
All four of
- Subacute onset (<12 weeks) of seizures, short-term memory loss, confusion, and psychiatric symptoms
- Neuropathologic or radiologic evidence (MRI, SPECT, PET) of involvement of the limbic system
- Exclusion of other possible aetiologies of limbic dysfunction
- Demonstration of a cancer within 5 years of the diagnosis of neurologic symptoms, or the development of classic symptoms of limbic dysfunction in association with a well-characterized paraneoplastic antibody (Hu, Ma2, CV2, amphiphysin, Ri)

The main distinction between the two sets of criteria is whether or not the detection of a paraneoplastic antibody is needed for diagnosis.

=== Antibodies against intracellular neuronal antigens ===
The main antibodies within this group are those against Hu, Ma2, CV2, amphiphysin and Ri. The syndrome of anti-Ma2 encephalitis may be clinically mistaken for Whipple's disease.

=== Antibodies against cell membrane antigens ===
The main antibodies within this group are those against N-methyl-D-aspartate receptors (NMDAR) and the voltage-gated potassium channel-complex (VGKC-complex). Anti-NMDAR encephalitis is strongly associated with benign tumours of the ovary (usually teratomata or dermoid cysts). Anti-VGKC-complex encephalitis is most often not associated with tumours.

Patients with NMDAR encephalitis are frequently young women who present with fever, headache and fatigue. This is often misdiagnosed as influenza, but progresses to severe behavioural and personality disturbance, delusions, paranoia and hallucinations. Patients may therefore initially be admitted to a psychiatric ward for acute psychosis or schizophrenia. The disease then progresses to catatonia, seizures and loss of consciousness. The next stage is hypoventilation (inadequate breathing) requiring intubation, orofacial dyskinesia and autonomic instability (dramatic fluctuations in blood pressure, temperature and heart rate).

=== Investigation ===
==== Cerebrospinal fluid (CSF) ====
Examination of cerebrospinal fluid (CSF) shows elevated numbers of lymphocytes (but usually < 100 cells/μl); elevated CSF protein (but usually <1.5 g/L), normal glucose, elevated IgG index and oligoclonal bands. Patients with antibodies to voltage-gated potassium channels may have a completely normal CSF examination.

==== Neuroimaging ====
Brain MRI is the mainstay of initial investigation pointing to limbic lobe pathology revealing increased T2 signal involving one or both temporal lobes in most cases.

Serial MRI in LE starts as an acute disease with uni- or bilateral swollen temporomesial structures that are hyperintense on fluid attenuation inversion recovery and T2-weighted sequences. Swelling and hyperintensity may persist over months to years, but in most cases progressive temporomesial atrophy develops.

PET-CT is not an essential investigation but can help in suspected cases with MRI negative for early diagnosis.

==== Neuro-electrophysiology ====
EEG is mostly nonspecific slowing and epileptiform activity arising from temporal lobes.

== Treatment ==
Limbic encephalitis is a rare condition with no randomised-controlled trials to guide treatment. Treatments that have been tried include intravenous immunoglobulin, plasmapheresis, corticosteroids, cyclophosphamide and rituximab.

If an associated tumour is found, then recovery is not possible until the tumour is removed. Unfortunately, this is not always possible, especially if the tumour is malignant and advanced.

== History ==
Clinical Features	Pathology	Year	Syndromes
Subacute onset of episodic memory impairment, disorientation and agitation, commonly associated with seizures, hallucinations, sleep disturbance	Medial temporal lobe inflammation	1960	Subacute encephalitis of later adult life mainly affecting the limbic areas
Subacute onset of episodic memory impairment, disorientation and agitation, commonly associated with seizures, hallucinations, sleep disturbance	Medial temporal lobe inflammation	1968	Limbic Encephalitis association with Carcinoma
Subacute onset of episodic memory impairment, disorientation and agitation, commonly associated with seizures, hallucinations, sleep disturbance	Medial temporal lobe inflammation	2008	Paraneoplastic LE with Lung Carcinoma, thymoma,
Subacute onset of episodic memory impairment, disorientation and agitation, commonly associated with seizures, hallucinations, sleep disturbance	Medial temporal lobe inflammation	2002	Non Paraneoplastic LE
